Bo (—in Hebrew, the command form of "go," or "come," and the first significant word in the parashah, in ) is the fifteenth weekly Torah portion (parashah) in the annual Jewish cycle of Torah reading and the third in the Book of Exodus. The parashah constitutes . The parashah tells of the last three plagues on Egypt and the first Passover.

The parashah is made up of 6,149 Hebrew letters, 1,655 Hebrew words, 106 verses, and 207 lines in a Torah Scroll. Jews read it the fifteenth Sabbath after Simchat Torah, generally in January or early February. As the parashah describes the first Passover, Jews also read part of the parashah, as the initial Torah reading for the first day of Passover, and another part, as the initial Torah reading for the first intermediate day (Chol HaMoed) of Passover. Jews also read another part of the parashah, which describes the laws of Passover, as the maftir Torah reading for the Special Sabbath Shabbat HaChodesh, which falls on Rosh Chodesh Nisan, the month in which Jews celebrate Passover.

Readings
In the Masoretic Text of the Hebrew Bible (Tanakh), Parashat Bo has seven "open portion" (petuchah) divisions (roughly equivalent to paragraphs, often abbreviated with the Hebrew letter  (peh)). Parashat Bo has seven further subdivisions, called "closed portion" (setumah) divisions (abbreviated with the Hebrew letter  (samekh)) within the open portion divisions. The first open portion contains the first and part of the second readings. The second open portion covers the balance of the second and part of the third readings. The third open portion covers the balance of the third and all of the fourth readings. The fourth open portion covers the fifth and part of the sixth readings. The fifth and sixth open portion divisions further divide the sixth reading. The seventh open portion divides the seventh reading. Closed portion divisions separate the first and second readings, separate the second and third readings, and separate the third and fourth readings. Further closed portion divisions divide the fourth and sixth readings, and conclude the seventh reading.

First reading—Exodus 10:1–11

In the first reading, after seven plagues, God continued visiting plagues on Egypt. Moses and Aaron warned Pharaoh to let the Israelites go, or suffer locusts (arbeh) covering the land. Pharaoh's courtiers pressed Pharaoh to let the men go, so Pharaoh brought Moses and Aaron back and asked them, "Who are the ones to go?" Moses insisted that young and old, sons and daughters, flocks and herds would go, but Pharaoh rejected Moses' request and expelled Moses and Aaron from his presence. The first reading and a closed portion end here.

Second reading—Exodus 10:12–23
In the second reading, Moses held his rod over the land, and God drove an east wind to bring locusts to invade all the land. Pharaoh summoned Moses and Aaron, asked forgiveness, and asked them to plead with God to remove the locusts. Moses did so, and God brought a west wind to lift the locusts into the Sea of Reeds. But God stiffened Pharaoh's heart, and he would not let the Israelites go. The first open portion ends here.

In the continuation of the reading, God instructed Moses to hold his arm toward the sky to bring darkness (choshech) upon the land, and Moses did so, but the Israelites enjoyed light. The second reading and a closed portion end here.

Third reading—Exodus 10:24–11:3
In the third reading, Pharaoh summoned Moses and told him to go, leaving only the Israelites' flocks and herds behind, but Moses insisted that none of the Israelites' livestock be left behind, for "[W]e shall not know with what we are to worship the Lord until we arrive there." But God stiffened Pharaoh's heart, and he expelled Moses saying: "[T]he moment you look upon my face, you shall die." The second open portion ends here with the end of chapter .

In the continuation of the reading in chapter , God told Moses that God would bring one more plague, and then Pharaoh would let the Israelites go. God told Moses to tell the Israelites to ask their neighbors for silver and gold, and God disposed the Egyptians to favor the Israelites and Moses. The third reading and a closed portion end here.

Fourth reading—Exodus 11:4–12:20
In the fourth reading, Moses warned Pharaoh that God would kill every firstborn in Egypt. And Moses left Pharaoh in hot anger. A closed portion ends here.

In the continuation of the reading, God told Moses and Aaron to mark that month as the first of the months of the year. And God told them to instruct the Israelites in the laws of the Passover service, of the Passover lamb, and of abstaining from leavened bread. (See Commandments below.) The fourth reading and the third open portion end here.

Fifth reading—Exodus 12:21–28
In the short fifth reading, Moses instructed the elders of Israel to kill their Passover lambs, paint their doorways with the lamb's blood, and remain inside their houses until the morning. For God would smite the Egyptians, but when God saw the blood on the lintel, God would pass over the house and not allow "the Destroyer" to come into that house. The Israelites were to observe the Passover service for all time, and when their children would ask what the service means, they were to say that it commemorated the time when God passed over the Israelites' houses when God smote the Egyptians. ' And the people bowed the head and worshipped. And the Israelites did as God commanded Moses and Aaron. The fifth reading and a closed portion end here.

Sixth reading—Exodus 12:29–51
In the sixth reading, in the middle of the night, God struck down all the firstborn in Egypt. Pharaoh arose in the night to a loud cry in Egypt, summoned Moses and Aaron, and told them to take the Israelites and go. So the Israelites took their dough before it was leavened, and asked for silver, gold, and clothing from the Egyptians. The fourth open portion ends here.

In the continuation of the reading, the Israelites and a mixed multitude journeyed from Rameses to Sukkot. They baked unleavened bread (matzah), because they could not delay before they left Egypt. The Israelites dwelt in Egypt for 430 years and left the land after the night of watching for the Lord. The fifth open portion ends here.

In the continuation of the reading, God told Moses and Aaron the laws of who was to keep the Passover. A closed portion ends here.

The reading concludes with a notice that on the same day, God bought the Israelites out of Egypt. The sixth reading and the sixth open portion end here with the end of chapter .

Seventh reading—Exodus 13:1–16

In the seventh reading, in chapter , God instructed Moses to tell the Israelites to consecrate to God every firstborn man and beast, and Moses did so. Moses told the people to remember the day and the month in which God brought them out of Egypt, and to keep the service to commemorate their deliverance in the same month, eating only unleavened bread (matzah). And they were to tell their children, to keep it as a sign upon their hands and for a memorial between their eyes, and to keep this ordinance in its season from year to year. The seventh open portion ends here.

In the continuation of the reading, God instructed Moses in the laws of the firstborn.

In the maftir reading that concludes the parashah, God instructed that if their children asked about consecrating the firstborn, the Israelites were to tell their children that God slew the firstborn of Egypt, and therefore the Israelites were to sacrifice to God all firstborn animals and redeem their firstborn sons. And thus it shall be for a sign upon their hands, and for frontlets between their eyes, for with a mighty hand God brought them out of Egypt. The seventh reading, a closed portion, and the parashah end here.

Readings according to the triennial cycle
Jews who read the Torah according to the triennial cycle of Torah reading read the parashah according to the following schedule:

In ancient parallels
The parashah has parallels in these ancient sources:

Exodus chapter 10
The plague of locusts in  finds parallels in several ancient texts, often involving the actions of gods. The ancient Sumerian tale The Disputation Between the Hoe and the Plow relates the acts of the god Enlil's hand and the locust swarm. Similarly, an Ugaritic poem about the goddess Anat circa 1450–1200 BCE related how Anat did battle, leaving corpses like locusts. In a New Kingdom Egyptian letter, one scribe chided another for leaving scribal work to labor in agriculture, where "The mice abound in the field, the locust descends, the cattle devour." An Akkadian prophecy foretold that locusts would arise and devour the land. The 754 BCE treaty between Ashur-nirari V of Assyria and Mati'ilu of Arpad, Syria, provided that if Mati'ilu violated the treaty, "May locusts appear and devour his land." Similarly, the treaty between Ktk and Arpad struck at about 750 BCE provided: "If Matti'el is false to Barga'yah and to his son and to his offspring . . . May Hadad pour out everything evil on earth and in heaven, and every trouble. And may he pour out hailstones upon Arpad. Seven years shall the locust eat. Seven years shall the worm eat. Seven years shall blight come upon the face of its land, and no grass shall sprout, so that nothing green can be seen and its vegetation does not appear." May they (the gods) let lice, caterpillars, and other field pests eat up your land and your district as if locusts." An Assyrian blessing wished: "The evil locust which ravages the grain, the malignant grasshopper which dries up the orchards, which would cut off the regular offerings of god and goddess,—Enlil listens to you, Tutu obeys you—may it (the grasshopper) be counted as nought!"

Exodus chapter 12
The command to apply blood to the lintel and the two door-posts in  parallels Babylonian Namburbi rituals in which blood was smeared on doors and keyholes so that "evil [plague] shall not enter the house."

Exodus chapter 13
Similarly, the Middle Egyptian (early second millennium BCE) tale of Sinuhe Palestine described the Land of Israel or, as the Egyptian tale called it, the land of Yaa: "It was a good land called Yaa. Figs were in it and grapes. It had more wine than water. Abundant was its honey, plentiful its oil. All kind of fruit were on its trees. Barley was there and emmer, and no end of cattle of all kinds."

In inner-biblical interpretation
The parashah has parallels or is discussed in these Biblical sources:

Exodus chapters 7–12
The description of the 10 plagues exhibits patterns and progressions, as follows:

Psalms  and  each recount differing arrangements of seven plagues.  recalls plagues of (1) blood, (2) flies, (3) frogs, (4) locusts, (5) hail, (6) livestock, and (7) firstborn, but not plagues of lice, boils, or darkness.  recalls plagues of (1) darkness, (2) blood, (3) frogs, (4) flies and lice, (5) hail, (6) locusts, and (7) firstborn, but not plagues of livestock or boils.

Exodus chapters 12–13

Passover

 and 43–50 and  refer to the Festival of Passover. In the Hebrew Bible, Passover is called:
"Passover" (Pesach);
"The Feast of Unleavened Bread" (Chag haMatzot); and
"A holy convocation" or "a solemn assembly" (mikrah kodesh).

Some explain the double nomenclature of "Passover" and "Feast of Unleavened Bread" as referring to two separate feasts that the Israelites combined sometime between the Exodus and when the Biblical text became settled.  and  indicate that the dedication of the firstborn also became associated with the festival.

Some believe that the "Feast of Unleavened Bread" was an agricultural festival at which the Israelites celebrated the beginning of the grain harvest.

"Passover," on the other hand, was associated with a thanksgiving sacrifice of a lamb, also called "the Passover," "the Passover lamb," or "the Passover offering."

Some believe that the propinquity of the dates of the two festivals led to their confusion and merger.

 and 27 link the word "Passover" (Pesach) to God's act to "pass over" (pasach) the Israelites' houses in the plague of the firstborn. In the Torah, the consolidated Passover and Feast of Unleavened Bread thus commemorate the Israelites' liberation from Egypt.

Both texts provide regulations concerning the Passover sacrifice, but the regulations differ.  instructed the Israelites to boil the Passover sacrifice. Sommer did not find such a disagreement in this ancient Jewish literature surprising, arguing that two groups in the Biblical period agreed that the Passover sacrifice was important but disagreed on its precise details.

The Hebrew Bible frequently notes the Israelites' observance of Passover at turning points in their history.  reports God's direction to the Israelites to observe Passover in the wilderness of Sinai on the anniversary of their liberation from Egypt.  reports that upon entering the Promised Land, the Israelites kept the Passover on the plains of Jericho and ate unleavened cakes and parched corn, produce of the land, the next day.  reports that King Josiah commanded the Israelites to keep the Passover in Jerusalem as part of Josiah's reforms, but also notes that the Israelites had not kept such a Passover from the days of the Biblical judges nor in all the days of the kings of Israel or the kings of Judah, calling into question the observance of even Kings David and Solomon. The more reverent , however, reports that Solomon offered sacrifices on the festivals, including the Feast of Unleavened Bread. And  reports King Hezekiah's observance of a second Passover anew, as sufficient numbers of neither the priests nor the people were prepared to do so before then. And  reports that the Israelites returned from the Babylonian captivity observed Passover, ate the Passover lamb, and kept the Feast of Unleavened Bread seven days with joy.

In early nonrabbinic interpretation
The parashah has parallels or is discussed in these early nonrabbinic sources:

Exodus chapter 12

The Book of Jubilees taught that the Israelites were forbidden to break any bone of the Passover lamb so that no bone should be crushed of the children of Israel.

Philo wrote that God instructed the Israelites to offer unleavened bread and bitter herbs together with the Passover sacrifice because unleavened bread signified great haste and speed, while bitter herbs signified the life of bitterness and struggle that the Israelites endured as slaves. Philo also taught that the deeper meaning was that leavened and fermented foods rose, while unleavened foods remained low, and each of these states symbolized types of the soul. Leavening symbolized the haughty soul swollen with arrogance, while the unleavened symbolized the unchangeable and prudent soul choosing the middle way rather than extremes. The bitter herbs manifested a psychic migration from passion to impassivity and from wickedness to virtue. For, Philo taught, those who naturally and genuinely repented became bitter toward their former way of life, lamenting the time that they had given over to the seductive and deceitful mistress of desire, being deceived by desire when they ought to have renewed themselves and advanced in the contemplation of wisdom toward the goal of a happy and immortal life. And so, those who desired repentance ate the unleavened bread with bitter herbs; they first ate bitterness over their old and unendurable life, and then ate the opposite of boastful arrogance in meditation on humility. For, Philo concluded, the memory of former sins caused fear, and by restraining sin through recollection, brought profit to the mind.

In classical rabbinic interpretation

The parashah is discussed in these rabbinic sources from the era of the Mishnah and the Talmud:

Exodus chapter 10

Rabbi Simeon ben Lakish (Resh Lakish) replied that the mouths of the heretics should be stopped up. For, as  teaches, "If it concerns the scorners, He scorns them." When God warns people once, twice, and even a third time, and they still do not repent, then God closes their hearts against repentance so that God may exact vengeance from them for their sins. Thus it was with the wicked Pharaoh. Since God sent five times to him (in the first five plagues) and he took no notice, God then told Pharaoh that he had stiffened his neck and hardened his heart, so God would add to Pharaoh's impurity. The Midrash taught that the expression "I hardened" (hichbad'ti) implied that God made Pharaoh's heart like a liver (kaveid), which stiffens (and becomes unabsorbent) if boiled a second time. So Pharaoh's heart was made like a liver, and he did not receive the words of God.

Rabbi Phinehas taught that if the godless, for whose repentance God waits, do not do so, then later on, even when they do think of it, God distracts their hearts from penitence. Thus after several plagues, Pharaoh wished to pray to God, but God told Moses in  "Before he goes out [to pray to God], stand before Pharaoh."

When both softened, God hardened their hearts, as  states. God closed their hearts to repentance to punish them for their earlier stubbornness.

Similarly, a Midrash taught that God inscribed abbreviations of the plagues on the staff of Moses, so that he would know which plague was next.

It was taught in a Baraita that Rabbi Judah the Prince (or others say Rabbi Meir) used to say that Providence repays a person measure for measure. Thus, a Midrash taught that God sent the plagues against Pharaoh measure for measure. God changed the Egyptians' water into blood because the Egyptians prevented the Israelites from using the ritual bath (mikveh) so as to prevent the Israelite women from having marital relations with their husbands. God brought frogs because the Egyptians had ordered the Israelites to bring them reptiles and creeping creatures (which were an abomination to the Israelites). God sent lice because the Egyptians had made the Israelites clean the dirty streets and marketplaces. God sent swarms of wild animals because the Egyptians had demanded that the Israelites catch bears, lions, and leopards so as to separate the Israelite men from their wives. God brought the pestilence upon the Egyptians' cattle because they had forced the Israelites to serve as shepherds so as to keep the Israelite men away from their wives. God sent boils because the Egyptians had demanded that the Israelites warm things for them. God sent hail to destroy the Egyptians' crops because the Egyptians had sent the Israelites into the fields to plow and sow. God brought the locusts to destroy the Egyptians' grain because the Egyptians had forced the Israelites to plant wheat and barley for them. God brought darkness because among the Israelites were transgressors who had Egyptian patrons and lived in affluence and honor in Egypt and did not want to leave Egypt, and so God brought darkness so that God could kill these transgressors without the Egyptians' seeing.

A Midrash taught that God brought the locusts upon the Egyptians in  because the Egyptians had made the Israelites sow wheat and barley for them, and thus God brought locusts to devour what the Israelites had sown for them.

A Midrash taught that God fixed a time of "tomorrow" for the plague of locusts in  so that the Egyptians might feel remorse and do penitence (thus showing that the Egyptians were still not barred from doing penitence).

So Moses turned to go out to allow them to talk about how to repent.

Reading in  that "Pharaoh's servants said to him: 'How long shall this man be a snare unto us?'" the Sages counted Pharaoh's servants among six exemplars who gave good advice, along with Naaman's servants, King Saul's ministers, the ministers of the King of Aram, and the ministers of King Ahasuerus.

It was to these two to whom Pharaoh alluded when he asked, "Who are they?"

Pharaoh thus perceived that Moses sought to do evil and flee.

The Mishnat Rabbi Eliezer taught that mockery yields evil results, for God did not change the course of nature in any of the plagues until Pharaoh mocked the Israelites. Pharaoh jeered at the Israelites, telling Moses "You tell me, 'The men, the women, and the children are to go'; yet you really need only the men." And since Pharaoh mocked the Israelites, God altered the course of nature and turned light into darkness upon Pharaoh.

The Mekhilta of Rabbi Ishmael called the east wind with which God brought the plague of the locusts in  "the mightiest of winds."

Then God became outraged that the Egyptians would rejoice with the plagues that God had brought upon them. And immediately (as reported in ), "the Lord turned an exceeding strong west wind, which took up the locusts."

A Midrash taught that God brought darkness upon the people in  because some Israelite transgressors had Egyptian patrons, lived in affluence and honor, and were unwilling to leave Egypt. God reasoned that bringing a plague and killing these transgressors publicly would cause the Egyptians to conclude that the plagues punished Egyptians and Israelites alike, and thus did not come from God. Thus, God brought darkness upon the Egyptians for three days, so that the Israelites could bury the dead transgressors without the Egyptians seeing them do so.

The Rabbis taught that there were seven days of darkness. During the first three days, one who wished to arise from sitting could do so, and the one who wished to sit down could do so. Concerning these days  says: "And there was a thick darkness in all the land of Egypt three days; and they did not see one another." During the last three days, one who sat could not stand up, one who stood could not sit down, and one who was lying down could not rise upright. Concerning these days  says: "neither rose any from his place for three days."

During the three days of thick darkness, God gave the Israelites favor in the eyes of the Egyptians, so that the Egyptians lent the Israelites everything. An Israelite would enter an Egyptian's house, and if the Israelite saw gold and silver vessels or garments, and when the Israelite asked for them the Egyptian replied that the Egyptian had nothing to lend, the Israelite would say where the goods were. The Egyptians would then reason that had the Israelites desired to deceive the Egyptians, they could have easily taken the goods during the darkness and the Egyptians would not have noticed. But since the Israelites did not take the goods, the Egyptians reasoned that the Israelites would not keep them. And so the Egyptians lent the Israelites their things, so as to fulfill what  foretold: "Afterward shall they come out with great substance."

The Midrash noted that  says: "but all the children of Israel had light in their dwellings," not, "in the land of Goshen," and concluded that light accompanied the Israelites wherever they went and illumined what was within barrels, boxes, and treasure-chests. Concerning them  says: "Your word is a lamp for my feet."

The Midrash taught that the six days of darkness occurred in Egypt, while the seventh day of darkness was a day of darkness of the sea, as  says: "And there was the cloud and the darkness here, yet it gave light by night there." So God sent clouds and darkness and covered the Egyptians with darkness, but gave light to the Israelites, as God had done for them in Egypt. Hence  says: "The Lord is my light and my salvation." And the Midrash taught that in the Messianic Age, as well, God will bring darkness to sinners, but light to Israel, as  says: "For, behold, darkness shall cover the earth, and gross darkness the peoples; but upon you the Lord will shine."

A Midrash noted that  reports that "Pharaoh's heart was hardened" without God's action, and that this was so for the first five plagues. As the first five plagues did not move Pharaoh to release the Israelites, God decreed that from then on, even if Pharaoh had agreed to release the Israelites, God would not accept it. Thus starting with the sixth plague and thereafter, as  reports, the text says, "the Lord hardened Pharaoh's heart."

Exodus chapter 11
Immediately therefore God hurriedly entered the palace of Pharaoh for the sake of Moses, so that Moses would not appear untruthful for having said that Moses would see Pharaoh's face no more. The Midrash taught that this was the only occasion when God spoke with Moses in Pharaoh's house. So God rushed into Pharaoh's palace and told Moses, as  reports, "Yet one plague more will I bring upon Pharaoh." When Moses heard this, he rejoiced. Moses then proclaimed, as  reports, "Thus says the Lord: 'About midnight will I go out into the midst of Egypt.'" Moses told Pharaoh that Pharaoh was right that Moses would see Pharaoh's face no more, for Moses would no longer come to Pharaoh, but Pharaoh would come to Moses. And not only would Pharaoh come, but also the chief of his hosts, his governor, and all his courtiers, imploring and prostrating themselves to Moses for the Israelites to depart from Egypt, as  reports that Moses said, "And all these your servants shall come down to me." Moses did not wish to say that Pharaoh would bow down to Moses, out of respect for royalty.

The Gemara deduced from the words, "About midnight I will go out into the midst of Egypt," in  that even Moses did not know exactly when midnight fell. The Gemara reasoned that  could not say "about midnight" because God told Moses "about midnight," for God cannot have any doubt about when midnight falls. Thus the Gemara concluded that God told Moses "at midnight," and then Moses told Pharaoh "about midnight" because Moses was in doubt as to the exact moment of midnight. But Rav Zeira argued that Moses certainly knew the exact time of midnight, but said "about midnight" because he thought that Pharaoh's astrologers might make a mistake as to the exact moment of midnight and then accuse Moses of being a liar.

Rabbi Johanan taught that Song of Songs  speaks of Moses when it says, "The voice of the turtle (tor) is heard in our land," reading the verse to mean, "The voice of the good explorer (tayyar) is heard in our land." Rabbi Johanan taught that  thus speaks of Moses at the time of which  reports: "And Moses said: 'Thus says the Lord: "About midnight will I go out into the midst of Egypt . . . ."'"

And Moses did so, as  reports that Moses told Pharaoh that God said, "And all these your servants shall come down to Me." Moses did not say that Pharaoh would come down, only that Pharaoh's servants would do so. But Moses could well have said that Pharaoh himself would come down, for  reports, "Pharaoh arose at midnight." But Moses did not mention Pharaoh specifically so as to pay him respect.

Rabbi Joshua ben Karhah taught that a lasting effect resulted from every instance of "fierce anger" in the Torah. In response, the Gemara reported that Resh Lakish taught that Moses slapped Pharaoh before he left Pharaoh's presence.

Exodus chapter 12
The Mishnah reported that on the fourth Sabbath of the month of Adar (Shabbat HaChodesh), congregations read .

The Mishnah taught that the first of Nisan is new year for kings and festivals.

The Pirke De-Rabbi Eliezer taught that God created the sun and the moon on the 28th of Elul. The entire Hebrew calendar—years, months, days, nights, seasons, and intercalation—were before God, and God intercalated the years and delivered the calculations to Adam in the Garden of Eden, as  can be read, "This is the calculation for the generations of Adam." Adam handed on the tradition to Enoch, who was initiated in the principle of intercalation, as  says, "And Enoch walked with God." Enoch passed the principle of intercalation to Noah, who conveyed the tradition to Shem, who conveyed it to Abraham, who conveyed it to Isaac, who conveyed it to Jacob, who conveyed it to Joseph and his brothers. When Joseph and his brothers died, the Israelites ceased to intercalate, as  reports, "And Joseph died, and all his brethren, and all that generation." God then revealed the principles of the Hebrew calendar to Moses and Aaron in Egypt, as  reports, "And the Lord spoke to Moses and Aaron in the land of Egypt saying, 'This month shall be to you the beginning of months.'" The Pirke De-Rabbi Eliezer deduced from the word "saying" in  that God said to Moses and Aaron that until then, the principle of intercalation had been with God, but from then on it was their right to intercalate the year. Thus the Israelites intercalated the year and will until Elijah returns to herald in the Messianic Age.

Rav Assi (or others say Rav Havivi) of Hozna'ah deduced from the words, "And it came to pass in the first month of the second year, on the first day of the month," in  that the Tabernacle was erected on the first of Nisan. With reference to this, a Tanna taught that the first of Nisan took ten crowns of distinction by virtue of the ten momentous events that occurred on that day.

Midrash Tanḥuma explained that before the Israelites erected the Tabernacle, God spoke to Moses from the burning bush, as  says, "God called to him out of the bush." After that, God spoke to Moses in Midian, as  says, "The Lord said to Moses in Midian." After that, God spoke to Moses in Egypt, as  says, "The Lord said to Moses and Aaron in the land of Egypt." After that, God spoke to Moses at Sinai, as  says, "The Lord spoke to Moses in the wilderness of Sinai." Once the Israelites erected the Tabernacle, God said, "modesty is beautiful," as  says, "and to walk humbly with your God," and God began talking with Moses in the Tent of Meeting.

And elsewhere, the Mishnah taught that intent to eat the Passover offering raw (violating the commandment of ) or to break the bones of the offering (violating the commandment of ) did not invalidate the offering itself. Similarly, the Mishnah in tractate Beitzah reported that the House of Shammai held that an olive's bulk of leavening or a date's bulk (which is more than an olive's bulk) of leavened bread in one's house made one liable, but the House of Hillel held that an olive's bulk of either made one liable. The Gemara cited these exceptions to support Rabbi Johanan's assertion that one may not draw inferences from general rules, for they often have exceptions.

The Mishnah taught that on the evening of the 14th of Nisan, Jews searched for leavened food in the house by candlelight. Any place into which one did not bring leavened food did not require checking. The Sages taught that one needed to check two rows in a wine cellar, as it was a place into which one brought leavened food. The House of Shammai taught that one needed to check the two front rows of the entire wine cellar, but the House of Hillel taught that one needed to check only the two outer rows that were uppermost. They did not worry that perhaps a weasel had dragged leavened bread from house to house, or from place to place, for if they had, they would have had to worry that the weasel had dragged leavened bread from courtyard to courtyard and from city to city, and there would have been no end to the matter. Rabbi Judah taught that they searched for leavened foods on the evening of the 14th, and on the morning of the 14th, and at the time that they destroyed the leavened foods (in the sixth hour—between 11 a.m. and noon). But the Sages maintained that if they did not search on the evening of the 14th, they needed to search on the 14th; if they did not search in the morning of the 14th, they needed to search at the time that they destroyed the leavened foods; if they did not search at that time, they needed to search after that time. And what they left over for the last morning meal before the Festival, they needed to put away in a hidden place, so that they should not need to search after it. Rabbi Meir taught that they could eat leavened foods through the fifth hour of the morning, and needed to burn it at the beginning of the sixth hour. Rabbi Judah taught that they could eat it through the fourth hour of the morning, needed to keep it in suspense during the fifth hour, and needed to burn it at the beginning of the sixth hour. Rabbi Judah also told that they used to put two unfit loaves of the thank offering on the roof of the Temple portico, and as long as the loaves lay there, all the people would eat leavened foods. When they would remove one loaf, the people would keep leavened foods in suspense, neither eating nor burning it. And when they removed both loaves, the people began burning their leavened foods. Rabban Gamaliel taught that unconsecrated leavened bread (chullin) could be eaten through the fourth hour of the morning, and leavened bread that was a heave-offering (terumah) could be eaten through the fifth hour, and they burned them at the beginning of the sixth hour. The Mishnah taught that during the entire time that one was permitted to eat leavened food, one was allowed to feed it to cattle, beasts, and birds; sell it to a gentile; and otherwise to benefit from it. When its period had passed, benefit from it was forbidden, and one was not even allowed to fire an oven or a pot range with it. Rabbi Judah taught that there was no destruction of leavened food except by burning. But the Sages maintained that one could also crumble it and throw it to the wind or casts it into the sea.

The Mishnah lists eating unleavened bread on Passover among 36 transgressions for which one may be liable to excision (karet).

The Mishnah taught that the grains with which one could discharge one's obligation (pursuant to ) to eat unleavened bread (matzah) on Passover included wheat, barley, spelt, rye, and oats. And the Mishnah taught that they discharged their obligation even with unleavened bread made from agricultural produce for which it was uncertain whether tithes had been separated (demai), with first tithe whose heave-offering had been separated, and with second tithe or consecrated materials that had been redeemed. And priests could discharge their obligation with unleavened bread made from the portion of dough that was given to priests (challah) and heave-offering (terumah). But one could not discharge the obligation with unleavened bread made from grain that was mixed or untithed (tevel), nor with first tithe whose heave-offering had not been separated, nor with second tithe or consecrated materials that had not been redeemed. As to the unleavened loaves of the thank offering and the wafers brought by a nazirite (nazir), the Sages made this distinction: If one made them for oneself, one could not discharge the obligation with them. But if one made them to sell in the market to those who required such products, one could discharge the obligation with them.

The Mishnah reported that if the 14th of Nisan falls on the Sabbath, Rabbi Meir taught that one must destroy leaven before the Sabbath (except for that required for the beginning of the Sabbath itself). But the Sages maintained that one destroys the leaven at its usual time (on the morning of the 14th). Rabbi Eleazar bar Zadok taught that one had to destroy consecrated meat before the Sabbath (because if any was left, none could eat it), and unconsecrated food at its usual time (because one could easily find eaters for it). The Mishnah taught that those on the way to perform religious duties who recollect leaven at home, if they are able to go back, destroy it, and then return to the religious duty, must go back and destroy it. But if they cannot, then they annul it in their heart. Similarly, those on the way to save people from an emergency annul it in their heart. But those on their way to appoint a Sabbath station to set the limits of where they may travel on the Sabbath must return immediately to destroy the leaven. Similarly, those who left Jerusalem and recollected that they had consecrated meat with them, if they had passed Mount Scopus, they burned it where they were. But if they had not traveled that far, they returned and burned it in front of the Temple with the wood arranged for use in the altar. The Mishnah then discussed for what quantity they had to return. Rabbi Meir said for both leaven and consecrated meat, they had to return for a quantity as much as an egg. Rabbi Judah said when there was as much as an olive. But the Sages ruled that for consecrated meat, they had to return for as much as an olive; while for leaven, they had to return for as much as an egg.

The Mishnah taught that where inhabitants customarily worked on the eve of Passover until noon, one could do so, while in a place where inhabitants customarily did not work, one could not. One who traveled from a place where they did work to a place where they did not work, or from a place where they did not work to a place where they did work, was bound by the stringencies of either. The Mishnah taught that a person should not deviate from the established customs of a place because of the disagreement to which such conduct could lead.

Rabbi Ḥanina, the adjunct head of the priests, taught that during all the days of the priests, they never refrained from burning sacrificial meat (terumah) that had become impure by a secondary source of impurity along with sacrificial meat that had become impure by a primary source of impurity, even though it would add impurity to impurity. Rabbi Akiva added that during all the days of the priests, they never refrained from lighting oil that had become unfit by contact with a person who had immersed that day for purification but who still needed to wait for nightfall to become fully pure (a tevul yom) in a lamp that had become impure by one who had become impure by a corpse, even though by so doing they would add impurity to impurity. Based on those teachings, Rabbi Meir argued that on Passover, priests could burn sacrificial meat that was pure but included leavening (chamets), together with sacrificial meat that was impure. Rabbi Jose replied that such a case was not analogous. Even Rabbi Eliezer and Rabbi Joshua conceded that each was burned separately. They did disagree, however, about sacrificial meat whose status of purity was in question and impure sacrificial meat, where Rabbi Eliezer taught that each had to be burned separately, whereas Rabbi Joshua taught that both of them could be burned together.

The Sages reported that in Judah, they would work on the eve of Passover until noon, while in the Galilee they did not work at all that day. On the evening of the fourteenth of Nisan in places like the Galilee, the School of Shammai forbad work, but the School of Hillel allowed it until sunrise. Rabbi Meir taught that on the fourteenth, one could finish work that one had started before the fourteenth, but one could not start work on the fourteenth even if one could finish it that day. The Sages taught that tailors, barbers, and launderers could work on the eve of Passover until noon, and Rabbi Jose ben Judah taught that even shoe strap-makers could do so. The Mishnah taught that one could place chickens in hatching-coops on the fourteenth, could place a hen that had run away back in its place, and could place another hen in the place of a hen that died. On the fourteenth, one could rake out the stable-dung from under the feet of domesticated animals, but only to remove it to the sides of the stable during the days of the festival. One could carry vessels and other articles to and from the house of a craftsperson, even if they were not needed during the festival. The Mishnah taught that the men of Jericho would graft palm trees the entire day of the fourteenth, and the Sages did not protest.

The Mishnah reported that whereas priests usually slaughtered the daily offering half an hour after the eighth hour and sacrificed it an hour later, on the eve of Passover, priests slaughtered the daily offering half an hour after the seventh hour and sacrificed it an hour later, whether the eve of Passover fell on a weekday or the Sabbath. But if the eve of Passover fell on Friday, priests slaughtered the daily offering half an hour after the sixth hour and sacrificed it an hour later, and then sacrificed the Passover sacrifice after it.

The Mishnah taught that a Passover sacrifice was disqualified if it was slaughtered without specific intent for it, or if its blood was received or brought to the altar or sprinkled without specific intent for it, or if any sacrificial act was done without specific intent for it. A sacrificial act was done without specific intent for a Passover sacrifice if it was done with the intention that it be a peace offering (shelamim). The Mishnah taught that a Passover sacrifice was disqualified if it was slaughtered for people who were not qualified to eat it, such as uncircumcised men or people in a state of impurity. But it was fit if it was slaughtered for people who able to eat it and people who were not able to eat it, or for people who were designated for it and people who were not designated for it, or for men circumcised and men uncircumcised, or for people in a state of impurity and people in a state of purity. It was disqualified if it was slaughtered before noon, as  says, "Between the evenings." It was fit if it was slaughtered before the daily offering of the afternoon, but only if someone had been stirring the blood until the blood of the daily offering had been sprinkled. And if that blood had already been sprinkled, the Passover sacrifice was still fit.

The Mishnah taught that one transgressed a negative commandment if one slaughtered a Passover sacrifice while in the possession of leavened grain products (chamets). Rabbi Judah taught that this also applied to the daily offering. Rabbi Simeon taught that if one slaughtered a Passover sacrifice on the fourteenth with specific intent for it, one was guilty, but if one slaughtered it without specific intent, one was exempt. For all other sacrifices, however, whether they were with or without specific intent, one was exempt. If one slaughtered a Passover sacrifice on the festival of Passover itself with specific intent, one was exempt; if without specific intent, one was guilty. With respect to all other sacrifices, one was guilty if one sacrificed them during the festival with or without specific intent, except for offerings brought to expiate sin (chatat) slaughtered without specific intent.

The Mishnah reported that they slaughtered the Passover sacrifice in three groups—assembly, congregation, and Israel—as  says, "The whole assembly of the congregation of Israel shall slaughter it." The first group entered until they filled the Temple courtyard, and then they closed the courtyard gates. Then they sounded Tekiah (a long uninterrupted call), Teruah (a long staccato call), and Tekiah. The priests would stand in double rows holding beakers of silver and beakers of gold, one row completely silver, and one row completely gold. None of the beakers had flat bottoms, so that the priests could not put them down and allow the blood coagulate.

A common Israelite would slaughter the Passover sacrifice, and a priest would receive the blood and give it to a fellow priest, who would give it to a fellow priest, and so on until the priest nearest to the altar would sprinkle it in one sprinkling at the base of the altar.  That priest would then return an empty beaker to the priest next to him, who would give it to a fellow priest, and so on, each priest both receiving full beakers and also returning empty beakers.

When the first group went out, the second group entered; when the second went out, the third entered. Each group proceeded alike. Each group would recite the Hallel. If they finished it, they would repeat it, but during all their days, they never recited it a third time.

The Mishnah taught that where inhabitants customarily ate roasted meat on Passover night, one could eat it, while where inhabitants customarily did not to eat it, one could not eat it.

Chapter 10 of Mishnah Pesachim taught the procedure for the Passover Seder. On the eve of Passover, no one was to eat from before the Minhah offering (about 3:00 pm) until nightfall. That night, even the poorest people in Israel were not to eat until they reclined in the fashion of free people. Every person was to drink not less than four cups of wine, even if the public charities had to provide it.

But one was not to eat unleavened bread (matzah) during the day before the Seder. Rabbi Levi said that those who eat unleavened bread on the day before Passover are like those who cohabit with their betrothed before they are fully married. Rava used to drink wine all day before the Seder so as to whet his appetite to eat more unleavened bread in the evening.

The Gemara taught that one needed to recline for the eating of the unleavened bread (matzah) and for the drinking of the wine, but not for the bitter herbs.

A Baraita taught that each of the four cups of wine needed to contain at least a reviis of wine (the volume of one and a half eggs, or roughly 4 to 5 ounces). And Rav Nachman bar Yitzchak taught that one must drink most of each cup.

The Tosefta taught that it is a religious duty for one to bring joy to one's children and dependents on Passover. The Tosefta taught that one brings them joy with wine, as  says, "wine . . . makes glad the heart of man." Rabbi Judah taught that one gives to women what is suitable to bring them joy and to children what is suitable to bring them joy. Similarly, in the Babylonian Talmud, the Rabbis taught that Jews are duty bound to make their children and their household rejoice on a Festival, for  says, "And you shall rejoice it, your feast, you and your son and your daughter." The Gemara taught that one makes them rejoice with wine. Rabbi Judah taught that men gladden with what is suitable for them, and women with what is suitable for them. The Gemara explained that what is suitable for men is wine. And Rav Joseph taught that in Babylonia, they gladdened women with colored garments, while in the Land of Israel, they gladdened women with pressed linen garments. Rabbi Judah ben Bathyra taught that in the days of the Temple in Jerusalem, Jews could not rejoice without meat (from an offering), as  says, "And you shall sacrifice peace-offerings, and shall eat there; and you shall rejoice before the Lord your God." But now that the Temple no longer exists, Jews cannot rejoice without wine, as  says, "And wine gladdens the heart of man."

The Mishnah continued that they mixed the first cup of wine for the leader of the Seder. The House of Shammai taught that the leader first recited a blessing for the day, and then a blessing over the wine, while the House of Hillel ruled that the leader first recited a blessing over the wine, and then recited a blessing for the day.

Then they set food before the leader. The leader dipped and ate lettuce (which was karpas) before the bread. They set before the leader unleavened bread (matzah), lettuce (hazeret), charoset, and two cooked dishes. The charoset was not mandatory, although Rabbi Eleazar son of Rabbi Zadok said that it was. In the days of the Temple in Jerusalem, they would bring the body of the Passover lamb before the leader.

The Mishnah listed several vegetables that could fulfill the requirement to have a bitter herb (maror). They have been translated as lettuce, chicory, pepperwort, endives, and dandelion.

They filled a second cup of wine for the leader. Then a child asked questions. If the child was not intelligent, the parent would instruct the child to ask why this night was different from all other nights. On all other nights they ate leavened and unleavened bread, while on this night they ate only unleavened bread (matzah). On all other nights, they ate all kinds of herbs, while on this night they ate only bitter herbs. (Early editions of the Mishnah and some editions of the Jerusalem Talmud did not include this item.) On all other nights, they ate meat roasted, stewed, or boiled, while on this night they ate only roasted meat. On all other nights, they dipped once, while on this night they dipped twice. (While the Jerusalem Talmud preserved this reading, some editions of the Babylonian Talmud emended this item to read, "On all other nights we do not have to dip even one time . . . .") And the parent instructed according to the child's intelligence. The parent began to answer the questions by recounting the people's humble beginnings, and concluded with the people's praise.

The Rabbis taught in a Baraita that if a child is intelligent enough to ask the four questions, the child asks them. If the child is not intelligent enough, the wife asks them. If the wife does not ask the questions, the leader of the seder asks them. And even two scholars who know the laws of Passover must ask one another (if no one else can ask).

The Mishnah stated that one answer to the questions of why this night is different from all other nights is that on all other nights we dip once; however, on this night we dip twice. In the Babylonian Talmud, Rava objected to this statement, questioning whether on every other day there was a requirement to dip once. Rather, Rava said that the Mishnah taught that on all other nights we are not obligated to dip even once; however, on this night we are obligated to dip twice. Rav Safra objected to this explanation, questioning whether one could deduce this from what we do simply to arouse children's curiosity. Rather, Rav Safra said that the Mishnah taught that normally we do not dip even once; however, on this night we dip twice.

The Mishnah taught that the parent begins the answer with disgrace and concludes with glory. The Gemara asked what the Mishnah meant by "with disgrace." In the Babylonian Talmud, Rav (Abba Arika) taught that the disgrace was that at first our forefathers were idol worshippers, while Samuel of Nehardea taught that the disgrace was that we were slaves. (Jews therefore follow Joshua's model, tracing their ignoble origins to the idolatrous background of their ancestors.)

Rabbi Akiva would distribute popcorn and nuts to children on the eve of Passover, so that they might not fall asleep but ask the four questions. Rabbi Eliezer taught that the unleavened bread (matzah) was eaten hastily on the night of Passover, on account of the children, so that they should not fall asleep. Rabbi Akiva never said in the house of study that it was time to stop studying, except on the eve of Passover and the eve of the Day of Atonement. On the eve of Passover, it was because of the children, so that they might not fall asleep, and on the eve of the Day of Atonement, it was so that they should feed their children before the fast.

The wise child asks, in the words of  "What mean the testimonies, and the statutes, and the ordinances, that the Lord our God has commanded you?" The Mekhilta taught that we explain to this child all the laws of Passover. The simple child asks, in the words of  "What is this?" The Mekhilta taught that we respond simply with the words of  "By strength of hand the Lord brought us out from Egypt, from the house of bondage." The wicked child asks, in the words of  "What do you mean by this service?" The Mekhilta taught that because wicked children exclude themselves, we should also exclude this child in answering and say, in the words of  "It is because of what the Lord did for me when I came forth out of Egypt"—for me but not for you; had you been there, you would not have been saved. As for the child who does not know how to ask, the Mekhilta taught that we take the initiative, as  says (without having reported that the child asked), "You shall tell your child on that day."

Rabban Gamaliel said that one needed to mention three things on Passover to discharge one's duty: the Passover offering, unleavened bread (matzah), and bitter herbs (maror). The Passover offering was sacrificed because God passed over the Israelites' houses in Egypt. They ate unleavened bread because the Israelites were redeemed from Egypt. And they ate bitter herbs because the Egyptians embittered the lives of the Israelites in Egypt. In every generation, all were bound to regard themselves as though they personally had gone out of Egypt, because  says, "You shall tell your child in that day: 'It is because of what the Lord did for me when I came out of Egypt.'" Therefore, it was everyone's duty to thank and praise God for performing those miracles for the Israelites and their descendants. God brought them forth from bondage into freedom, from sorrow into joy, from mourning into festivity, from darkness into light, and from servitude into redemption. Therefore, they were to say hallelujah!

In the Mishnah, the House of Shammai and the House of Hillel disagreed about how far one should recite into the Hallel, . The Tosefta and the Jerusalem Talmud reported that the House of Shammai argued to the House of Hillel that since the original Passover meal in Egypt preceded the Exodus, it would be inappropriate at a Passover seder to give thanks for the Exodus. The House of Hillel argued to the House of Shammai that since the Israelites only left Egypt at midday (for which the Jerusalem Talmud cited , which it read to say, "And it came to pass in the middle of that day"), it would still be inappropriate to mention the Exodus on the morning after the seder. The Jerusalem Talmud reported that the House of Hillel concluded that once one has started a religious duty, one should finish it. And Rabbi Abuna bar Sehorah questioned the argument of the House of Shammai, as one will already have mentioned the Exodus from Egypt in the Sanctification blessing said over a cup at the seder's beginning.

The Mishnah taught that one concluded with a blessing of redemption. Rabbi Tarfon used to say (that the blessing included), "who redeemed us and redeemed our fathers from Egypt," but one did not conclude with a blessing. Rabbi Akiva said (that one added to Rabbi Tarfon's version the following), "So may the Lord our God and the God of our fathers allow us to reach other seasons and festivals in peace, rejoicing in the rebuilding of Your city and glad in Your service, and there we will eat the sacrifices and the Passover-offerings . . . ," (and one proceeded) as far as, "Blessed are You, o Lord, who have redeemed Israel."

The Mishnah continued that they filled the third cup of wine. The leader then recited the Grace After Meals. Over the fourth cup, the leader concluded the Hallel, and recited the grace of song. Between the first, second, and third cups, one could drink if one wished, but between the third and the fourth cups one was not permitted to drink.

One may not conclude the Passover meal with dainties. If some of the party fell asleep, they could eat when they awoke, but if all fell asleep, they were not permitted to eat. Rabbi Jose said that if they slept only lightly, they could eat, but if they fell fast asleep, they were not permitted to eat.

Rabban Gamaliel once reclined at a Passover seder at the house of Boethus ben Zeno in Lud, and they discussed the laws of the Passover all night until the cock crowed. Then they raised the table, stretched, and went to the house of study.

The Mishnah taught that the prohibitions of  that "seven days shall there be no leaven found in your houses" and of  that "no leaven shall be seen in all your territory" applied to the first Passover; while at the second Passover, one could have both leavened and unleavened bread in one's house. And the Mishnah taught that for the first Passover, one was required to recite the Hallel when the Passover lamb was eaten; while the second Passover did not require the reciting of Hallel when the Passover lamb was eaten. But both the first and second Passovers required the reciting of Hallel when the Passover lambs were offered, and both Passover lambs were eaten roasted with unleavened bread (matzah) and bitter herbs. And both the first and second Passovers took precedence over the Sabbath.

Thus, when God told Moses to slay the paschal lamb (as reflected in ), Moses asked God how he could possibly do so, when the lamb was as Egyptian god. God replied that the Israelites would not depart from Egypt until they slaughtered the Egyptian gods before the Egyptians' eyes, so that God might teach them that their gods were really nothing at all. And thus God did so, for on the same night that God slew the Egyptian firstborn, the Israelites slaughtered their paschal lambs and ate them. When the Egyptians saw their firstborn slain and their gods slaughtered, they could do nothing, as  reports, "While the Egyptians were burying them whom the Lord had smitten among them, even all their firstborn; upon their gods also the Lord executed judgment."

The Midrash noted that many things appear lowly, but God commanded many precepts to be performed with them.

The Mishnah described the appropriate hyssop for ceremonial use as a bunch containing three stalks bearing three buds. Rabbi Judah said three stalks bearing three buds each.

Reading , regarding the Hebrew servant who chose not to go free and whose master brought him to the doorpost and bore his ear through with an awl, Rabbi Simeon bar Rabbi explained that God singled out the doorpost from all other parts of the house because the doorpost was witness in Egypt when God passed over the lintel and the doorposts (as reported in ) and proclaimed (in the words of ), "For to me the children of Israel are servants, they are my servants," and not servants of servants, and so God brought them forth from bondage to freedom, yet this servant acquired a master for himself.

Moreover, he even begins with the righteous at the outset, as  says, "And I will cut off from you the righteous and the wicked" (mentioning the righteous first). Rav Joseph wept at this, but Abaye consoled him, saying that this is for their advantage, as  says, "That the righteous is taken away from the evil to come."

Reading , "For the Lord will pass through to smite the Egyptians," a Midrash observed that some say that God acted through the medium of an angel ("the Destroyer," , ha-mashchit), while others said that God acted on God's own.

The Midrash thus questioned why  says, "And when He sees the blood upon the lintel." The Midrash explained that this followed the usual practice, just as a butcher marks with red paint those sheep destined for slaughter to distinguish them from those that the butcher wishes to keep alive. So the Midrash told that God stood at the door and thrust away the Destroyer so that he should not smite the Israelites.

And the Mekhilta of Rabbi Ishmael taught that God preserved him as the only firstborn of Egypt to survive the plague.

The Mekhilta of Rabbi Ishmael asked how the captives had sinned that God struck their firstborn, as  reports. The Mekhilta of Rabbi Ishmael explained that God struck them so that they should not say that their god brought this punishment on the Egyptians but not on them. Alternatively, the Mekhilta of Rabbi Ishmael told that God struck them because the captives used to rejoice over every decree that Pharaoh decreed against the Israelites. And the Mekhilta of Rabbi Ishmael taught that the Egyptian servants did so, as well, thus explaining why God said in  that God would strike the firstborn of the maidservant who was behind the mill.

Reading the report of  that "there was not a house where there was not one dead," Rabbi Nathan asked whether there were no houses without firstborn. The Mekhilta of Rabbi Ishmael explained that when an Egyptian firstborn would die, the parents would set up a statue of the firstborn in the house. The Mekhilta of Rabbi Ishmael further taught that on the night of the plague of the firstborn, God crushed, ground, and scattered those statues as well, and the parents grieved anew as though they had just buried their firstborn.

The Mekhilta of Rabbi Ishmael explained that the Egyptians said, "We are all dead men," in  because in many families, many sons died. The Egyptian men had thought that a man who had four or five sons would have lost only the eldest, in accord with the warning of Moses in  that "the firstborn in the land of Egypt shall die." But they did not know, told the Mekhilta of Rabbi Ishmael, that all their sons were the firstborn sons of different bachelors with whom their wives had committed adultery. God exposed the women's adultery, and all of the sons died. The Mekhilta of Rabbi Ishmael taught that if God makes public evil, which is of lesser importance, how much more will God reward good, which is of greater importance.

Some said that it was against the Egyptians' will, while others said that it was against the Israelites' will. Those who said that it was against the Egyptians' will cite , "And she who waits at home divides the spoil." Those who said that it was against the Israelites' will said that it was because of the burden of carrying the Egyptians' goods. Resh Lakish said that they made Egypt it like a pond without fish.

Rav Judah in the name of Samuel of Nehardea deduced from  that Joseph gathered in and brought to Egypt all the gold and silver in the world. The Gemara noted that  says: "And Joseph gathered up all the money that was found in the land of Egypt, and in the land of Canaan," and thus spoke about the wealth of only Egypt and Canaan. The Gemara deduced from the words "and they despoiled the Egyptians" in  that when the Israelites left Egypt, they carried that wealth away with them. The Gemara then taught that the wealth lay in Israel until the time of King Rehoboam, when King Shishak of Egypt seized it from Rehoboam, as  reports: "And it came to pass in the fifth year of king Rehoboam, that Shishak king of Egypt came up against Jerusalem; and he took away the treasures of the house of the Lord, and the treasures of the king's house."

A Baraita taught that in the time of Alexander the Great, the Egyptians summoned the Israelites before Alexander, demanding from them the gold and silver that  reported that the Israelites had borrowed from the Egyptians. The sages granted Gebiah ben Pesisa permission to be Israel's advocate. Gebiah asked the Egyptians what the evidence was for their claim, and the Egyptians answered that the Torah provided their evidence. Then Gebiah said that he would also bring evidence from the Torah in Israel's defense. He quoted  and demanded back wages from the Egyptians for the labor of 600,000 Israelite men whom the Egyptians had compelled to work for them for 430 years. Alexander turned to the Egyptians for a proper answer. The Egyptians requested three days' time, but could not find a satisfactory answer, and they fled.

A Midrash taught that the Israelites were counted on ten occasions: (1) when they went down to Egypt; (2) when they went up out of Egypt; (3) at the first census in Numbers; (4) at the second census in Numbers; (5) once for the banners; (6) once in the time of Joshua for the division of the Land of Israel; (7) once by Saul (1 Samuel ); (8) a second time by Saul; (9) once by David; and once in the time of Ezra.

A Midrash explained that Moses numbered the Israelites like a shepherd to whom an owner entrusted a flock by number. When the shepherd came to the end of the shepherd's time, on returning them, the shepherd had to count them again. When Israel left Egypt, God entrusted the Israelites to Moses by number, as  reports, "And the Lord spoke to Moses in the wilderness of Sinai . . . 'Take the sum of all the congregation of the children of Israel.'" And  records that "the children of Israel journeyed from Rameses to Succoth, about 600,000 men on foot," demonstrating that Moses took responsibility for the Israelites in Egypt by number.

A Baraita taught that King Ptolemy brought together 72 elders and placed them in 72 separate rooms, without telling them why he had brought them together, and asked each of them to translate the Torah. God then prompted each of the elders to conceive the same idea and not to follow the Masoretic Text in their translation in a number of cases, including , "And the abode of the children of Israel which they stayed in Egypt and in other lands was 400 years." The translation of the 72 elders inserted the words "and in other lands," because, according to the Biblical record, the Israelites were in Egypt at most 210 years.

Resh Lakish interpreted this to mean that God gave Moses strength because he broke the tablets.

Rabbi Judah ben Bathyra asked him whether he had ever eaten of the fat tail, and the Syrian replied that he had not. So Rabbi Judah ben Bathyra told the Syrian that the next time he went to Jerusalem for Passover, he should ask them to give him the fat tail. So when the Syrian went up, he asked them for the fat-tail. They answered him that the fat-tail belongs to God (and is burnt on the altar) and asked him who told him to ask for it. The Syrian told them that Rabbi Judah ben Bathyra had done so. Their suspicions aroused, they investigated who the Syrian was, discovered that he was not a Jew, and killed him. Then they sent a message to Rabbi Judah ben Bathyra saying that he was in Nisibis (in northern Mesopotamia), yet his net was spread in Jerusalem.

The Midrash quoted , in which Job said, "The stranger did not lodge in the street" (that is, none were denied hospitality), to show that God disqualifies no one, but receives all; the city gates were open all the time and anyone could enter them. Thus these verses reflect the Divine example of accepting all. The Midrash taught that strangers will one day partake of the showbread, because their daughters will be married into the priesthood. Hence , says: "Neither let the alien, who has joined himself to the Lord, speak, saying: 'The Lord will surely separate me from his people.'" And converts can certainly celebrate the Paschal offering.

The Midrash taught that , "Let my heart be undivided in your statutes," refers to this similarity, and asked which statute is greater than the other. The Midrash likened this to the case of two ladies who were walking side by side together apparently on an equal footing; who then is the greater? She whom her friend accompanies to her house and so is really being followed by the friend. The Midrash concluded that the law of the Red Cow is the greater, for those who eat the Passover need the Red Cow's purifying ashes, as  says, "And for the unclean they shall take of the ashes of the burning of the purification from sin."

The Mekhilta of Rabbi Ishmael asked why  directed that there be one law for both the native and the stranger who sojourns among us when  had just enjoined that the stranger be treated as one who is born in the land. The Mekhilta of Rabbi Ishmael concluded that  comes to declare that the convert is equal to the born Jew with respect to all the Torah's commandments.

The Pirke de-Rabbi Eliezer read  to say, "And it came to pass at the essential part of the day, that the Lord did bring the children of Israel out of the land of Egypt by their hosts." The Pirke de-Rabbi Eliezer taught that God thought that if God brought the Israelites out by night, the Egyptians would say that God acted like a thief. Therefore, God decided to bring the Israelites out when the sun was at its zenith at midday.

Exodus chapter 13

Elsewhere, the Mishnah drew from  that money in exchange for a firstborn donkey could be given to any Kohen; that if a person weaves the hair of a firstborn donkey into a sack, the sack must be burned; that they did not redeem with the firstborn of a donkey an animal that falls within both wild and domestic categories (a koy); and that one was prohibited to derive benefit in any quantity at all from an unredeemed firstborn donkey. And elsewhere, the Mishnah taught that before the Israelites constructed the Tabernacle, the firstborns performed sacrificial services, but after the Israelites constructed the Tabernacle, the priests (Kohanim) performed the services.

Once when Rami bar Ezekiel visited Bnei Brak, he saw goats grazing under fig trees while honey was flowing from the figs, and milk dripped from the goats mingling with the fig honey, causing him to remark that it was indeed a land flowing with milk and honey. Rabbi Jacob ben Dostai said that it is about three miles from Lod to Ono, and once he rose up early in the morning and waded all that way up to his ankles in fig honey. Resh Lakish said that he saw the flow of the milk and honey of Sepphoris extend over an area of sixteen miles by sixteen miles. Rabbah bar Bar Hana said that he saw the flow of the milk and honey in all the Land of Israel and the total area was equal to an area of twenty-two parasangs by six parasangs.

Rabban Gamaliel taught that in every generation, all are duty bound to regard it as if they personally had gone forth from Egypt, as  says, "And you shall tell your son in that day saying, it is because of that which the Lord did for me when I came forth out of Egypt."

The Mishnah thus concluded that a cow that gave birth to a calf like a donkey and a donkey that gave birth to a foal like a horse are exempt from their offspring being considered a firstborn.

In medieval Jewish interpretation

The parashah is discussed in these medieval Jewish sources:

Exodus chapter 10
The offender would thus be prevented from doing repentance, and would not have the power to return from the offense, and the offender would die and be lost because of the offense. Similarly  reports, "They ridiculed the messengers of God, disdained His words and insulted His prophets until the anger of God rose upon the people, without possibility of healing." Maimonides interpreted these verses to teach that they sinned willingly and to such an egregious extent that they deserved to have repentance withheld from them. Because Pharaoh sinned on his own at the beginning, harming the Jews who lived in his land, as  reports him scheming, "Let us deal craftily with them," God issued the judgment that repentance would be withheld from Pharaoh until he received his punishment. Maimonides explained that God sent Moses to tell Pharaoh to send out the Jews and do repentance, when God had already told Moses that Pharaoh would refuse, because God sought to inform humanity that when God withholds repentance from a sinner, the sinner will not be able to repent. Maimonides made clear that God did not decree that Pharaoh harm the Jewish people; rather, Pharaoh sinned willfully on his own, and he thus deserved to have the privilege of repentance withheld from him.

According to Hezekiah ben Manoah (Hizkuni), Pharaoh's courtiers in  "questioned Pharaoh's judgment by asking him if he wanted to wait until the whole of Egypt was ruined? They implied that if Egypt were to be ruined, in the end Pharaoh would have no option but to give in to the Israelites' demands. Why not give in while Egypt was still a functioning nation?"

Reading , "Moses said: 'We will go with our young and with our old,'" the Lekach Tov taught that Moses told Pharaoh that just as all had been in Pharaoh's service, so would all be in God's service.

Exodus chapter 12
Maimonides taught that the prerogative to sanctify the New Moon at its sighting and to set a leap year to reconcile the calendar applied to the Sanhedrin in the Land of Israel. When the Sanhedrin ended in the Land of Israel, Jews established the monthly calendar and instituted leap years solely according to the fixed calendar that is followed now. So the sighting of the moon is no longer of any consequence.

According to Maimonides, Passover is kept seven days, because a week is the intermediate unit of time between a day and a month. Passover teaches people to remember the miracles that God performed in Egypt, encouraging people to thank God repeatedly and to lead a modest and humble life. Jews therefore eat unleavened bread and bitter herbs on Passover in memory of what happened to the Israelites. And they eat unleavened bread for a week because if the eating were only for one day, Jews might not notice it.

The Zohar taught that on the night of the Exodus, there were three slayings in Egypt. First, the firstborn killed whomever they could lay hands on. Then, God executed judgment at midnight. And lastly, Pharaoh, on seeing the havoc wrought upon his own household, arose, as  says, "He rose up at midnight," and with bitterness and fury he killed the princes and nobles who had advised him to persecute Israel, just as a dog, if hit with a stone, goes and bites another dog.

Reading , "And the people took their dough before it was leavened," the Zohar taught that "leaven" and "unleaven" symbolize the evil inclination (yeitzer ra) and the good inclination in people. The Zohar taught that one who fervently and joyously relates the story of the Exodus on Passover, telling the story with a high heart, shall be found worthy to rejoice in the Divine Presence (Shekhinah) in the World To Come. The Zohar taught that the joy of Israel causes God to be glad, so that God calls together all the family above and to hear the praises that God's children bring to God. Then all the angels and supernal beings gather around and observe Israel singing and rejoicing because of God's Redemption and the supernal beings also break into jubilation because God possesses on earth a people so holy, whose joy in God's Redemption is so great and so powerful. And the Zohar taught that the rejoicing on Earth below increases the power of God and God's hosts in the regions above, just as an earthly king gains strength from the praises of his subjects and the renown of his glory being spread through the world.

Reading  "The Lord spoke . . . in the Sinai Desert . . . on the first of the month . . . 'Take a census,'" Rashi taught that God counted the Israelites often because they were dear to God. On the first of Nisan, the Tabernacle was erected, and on the first of Iyar, God counted them.

The Zohar taught that the "mixed multitude" (erev rav) mentioned in  consisted entirely of Egyptian sorcerers and magicians, who sought to oppose God's works, as  reports, "And the magicians of Egypt, they also did in like manner with their enchantments." When they beheld the signs and the wonders that Moses performed, they came to Moses to be converted. God advised Moses not to accept them, but Moses argued that now that they had seen God's power, they desired to accept the Israelites' Faith, and if they saw God's power every day, they would learn that there is no God like God. So Moses accepted them.  called them a "mixed multitude" because they consisted of all the grades of Egyptian magicians, at their head being Jannes and Jambres. During the day, these wizards practiced their enchantments, and after sunset, they made observations of the heavens until the middle of the ninth hour, which was called the "great evening" (erev rav, which means both "great multitude" and "great evening"). The lesser magicians then made observation after that until midnight. The Egyptians, who had great faith in the chief wizards, thus called them the "great evening" (erev rav).

Exodus chapter 13
Maimonides noted that in nature, God created animals that develop gradually. For example, when a mammal is born, it is extremely tender, and cannot eat dry food, so God provided breasts that yield milk to feed the young animal, until it can eat dry food. Similarly, Maimonides taught, God instituted many laws as temporary measures, as it would have been impossible for the Israelites suddenly to discontinue everything to which they had become accustomed. So God sent Moses to make the Israelites (in the words of ) "a kingdom of priests and a holy nation." But the general custom of worship in those days was sacrificing animals in temples that contained idols. So God did not command the Israelites to give up those manners of service, but allowed them to continue. God changed the service of idol worship to the service of the Sanctuary, to erect the altar to God's name, to offer sacrifices to God, to bow down to God, and to burn incense before God. By this Divine plan, God blotted out the traces of idolatry, and established the great principle of the Existence and Unity of God. But the sacrificial service, Maimonides taught, was not the primary object of God's commandments about sacrifice; rather, supplications, prayers, and similar kinds of worship are nearer to the primary object. Thus God limited sacrifice to only one temple (see ) and the priesthood to only the members of a particular family. These restrictions, Maimonides taught, served to limit sacrificial worship, and kept it within such bounds that God did not feel it necessary to abolish sacrificial service altogether. But in the Divine plan, prayer and supplication can be offered everywhere and by every person, as can be the wearing of tzitzit and tefillin (16) and similar kinds of service.

Maimonides taught that it is a positive commandment for every Jewish man to redeem his son who is the firstborn of a Jewish mother, as  says, "All first issues of the womb are mine," and  says, "And you shall surely redeem a firstborn man." Maimonides taught that a mother is not obligated to redeem her son. If a father fails to redeem his son, when the son comes of age, he is obligated to redeem himself. If it is necessary for a man to redeem both himself and his son, he should redeem himself first and then his son. If he only has enough money for one redemption, he should redeem himself. A person who redeems his son recites the blessing: "Blessed are You . . . who sanctified us with His commandments and commanded us concerning the redemption of a son." Afterwards, he recites the shehecheyanu blessing and then gives the redemption money to the Cohen. If a man redeems himself, he should recite the blessing: "Blessed . . . who commanded us to redeem the firstborn" and he should recite the shehecheyanu blessing. The father may pay the redemption in silver or in movable property that has financial worth like that of silver coins. If the Cohen desires to return the redemption to the father, he may. The father should not, however, give it to the Cohen with the intent that he return it. The father must give it to the Cohen with the resolution that he is giving him a present without any reservations. Cohens and Levites are exempt from the redemption of their firstborn, as they served as the redemption of the Israelites' firstborn in the desert. A baby born by Caesarian section and any subsequent birth are exempt: the first because it did not emerge from the womb, and the second, because it was preceded by another birth. The obligation for redemption takes effect when the baby completes 30 days of life, as  says, "And those to be redeemed should be redeemed from the age of a month."

In modern interpretation
The parashah is discussed in these modern sources:

Exodus chapter 10
Greta Hort argued that the plagues concentrated within a period of about 12 months, based on the report of  that Moses was 80 years old when he first spoke with pharaoh and the report of  that Moses was 120 years old when he died, after spending 40 years in the wilderness.

John J. Collins reported that some scholars have suggested that the plague stories contain a reminiscence of a mid-fourteenth century BCE epidemic referred to as "the Asiatic illness."

Collins argued that the plague stories show that Exodus is not only the story of the liberation of Israel, but also of the defeat and humiliation of the Egyptians, and thus involved "less than edifying" nationalistic, ethnic vengeance.

Everett Fox noted that "glory" (kevod) and "stubbornness" (kaved lev) are leading words throughout the book of Exodus that give it a sense of unity.

Plaut wrote that the Habiru were a class of people who lived in the Fertile Crescent during the 19th to 14th centuries B.C.E. who may originally have come from Arabia, became prominent in Mesopotamia, and later spread to Egypt. The Habiru followed distinct occupations, particularly mercenaries and administrators. Although at first they were nomads or seminomads, they later settled. They were usually considered foreigners, maintaining their group identity. The term Habiru referred not so much to an ethnic or linguistic group as to a social or political group. Plaut reported that the words Habiru and "Hebrew" (Ivri) appear to share a common linguistic root. Plaut concluded that Israelites in Egypt likely occupied positions similar to, or because of familial ties were identified with, the Habiru. When non-Israelites repeatedly applied the term to the Israelites, the Israelites themselves began to use the name Habiru, which they pronounced Ivri. Plaut considered it possible that for some time the term Ivri was used only when the Israelites spoke of themselves to outsiders and when outsiders referred to them.

, and the houses of all your servants, and the houses of all the Egyptians," in that order. Arguing that the Pharaoh's palace was surely the most insulated, the Kli Yakar taught that the order of the locust invasion was another miracle, so that the punishment would come in the order that the sin was committed, first with Pharaoh (who was most guilty), then with his servants, and then the rest of the people.

Moritz Markus Kalisch read  to indicate that Pharaoh's servants, whom Kalisch identified with Pharaoh's magicians, had become convinced of God's unlimited power.

Samson Raphael Hirsch read  to indicate that Pharaoh's servants viewed the cycle of partial plagues and respites as a "trap!"

Nahum Sarna noted that Aaron, not Moses, brought on the early signs and plagues. Sarna explained that Moses thus tacitly asserted his equal status with Pharaoh. Moses came to negotiate with Pharaoh as the representative of the people of Israel. Just as Pharaoh had his magicians, Moses had his assistant, Aaron. Sarna noted that in the narratives of the Ten Plagues, Aaron acted only as long as the Egyptian magicians appeared present. After their ingenuity failed them and they faded from the story, Moses acted personally to bring about the remaining plagues.

Exodus chapter 12

Julius Wellhausen conceived of early Israelite religion as linked to nature's annual cycle and believed that Scripture only later connected the festivals to historical events like the Exodus from Egypt. James Kugel reported that modern scholars generally agreed that Passover reflects two originally separate holidays arising out of the annual harvest cycle. One Festival involved the sacrificing and eating of an animal from the flock, the pesa sacrifice, which arose among shepherds who sacrificed in the light of the full moon of the month that marked the vernal equinox and the end of winter (as directed in ) to bring Divine favor for a safe and prosperous summer for the rest of the flock. The shepherds slaughtered the animal at home, as the rite also stipulated that some of the animal's blood be daubed on the doorposts and lintel of the house (as directed in ) to ward off evil. The rite prescribed that no bone be broken (as directed in ) so as not to bring evil on the flock from which the sacrifice came. A second Festival—the Festival of Unleavened Bread—involved farmers eating unleavened barley bread for seven days when the winter's barley crop had reached maturity and was ready for harvest. Modern scholars believe that the absence of yeast in the bread indicated purity (as in ). Modern scholars suggest that the farmers' Festival of Unleavened Bread and the shepherds' Passover later merged into a single festival, Passover moved from the home to the Temple, and the combined festival was explicitly connected to the Exodus (as in ).

Collins argued that all we can really say is that the biblical Exodus account was written some time after the building of Pi-Ramesse and Per-Atum, and possibly that the author knew of a tradition associating Semitic laborers with those cities.

Finkelstein and Silberman reported that a late thirteenth century BCE Egyptian papyrus recorded that the commanders of the forts along the delta's eastern border closely monitored the movements of foreigners there, saying: "We have completed the entry of the tribes of the Edomite Shasu (that is, Bedouin) through the fortress of Merneptah-Content-with-Truth, which is in Tjkw, to the pools of Pr-Itm which (are) in Tjkw for the sustenance of their flocks." And Finkelstein and Silberman reported that the abundant Egyptian sources describing the time of the New Kingdom of Egypt in general and the thirteenth century in particular make no reference to the Israelites. Finkelstein and Silberman concluded that based on the evidence at the specific sites where  says that the Israelites camped for extended periods during their wandering in the desert (and where some archaeological indication—if present—would almost certainly be found), a mass Exodus did not happen at the time and in the manner described in the Bible.

Plaut noted that while some might read the report of  that the time of Israel's servitude would be 400 years to conflict with the report of  that the descent into Egypt would last 430 years, the two accounts were left standing side by side, because ancient readers might have considered both traditions to have come down to them and therefore requiring treatment with reverence.

Plaut observed that both addenda speak from a context of settled conditions, rather than wilderness wandering. Plaut concluded that the two sections read like postscripts or summations appended to the main story at a later time.

Exodus chapter 13
Thus the Torah continued the custom of offering firstborn on the altar only for clean domestic animals; for unclean animals, the Torah substituted redemption by a clean animal or the breaking of its neck; and for human firstborn, the Torah substituted only redemption. And the Torah substituted the new reason of the deliverance from Egyptian bondage.

Sarna wrote that in many ancient cultures, the miracle of new life was considered a divine gift and nature endowed the first fruits of the soil and animal and human fertility with intrinsic holiness. The Torah dissociated the firstborns' status from the ancient ideas, teaching that firstborns belonged to God solely because of Divine decree at the time of the Exodus.

MacDonald wrote that the term for milk (chalav) could easily be the word for "fat" (chelev), and the word for honey (devash) could indicate not bees' honey but a sweet syrup made from fruit. The expression evoked a general sense of the bounty of the land and suggested an ecological richness exhibited in a number of ways, not just with milk and honey. MacDonald noted that the expression was always used to describe a land that the people of Israel had not yet experienced, and thus characterized it as always a future expectation.

Ephraim Speiser wrote that the word "Torah" is based on a verbal stem signifying "to teach, guide," and the like, and the derived noun can carry a variety of meanings.

Milgrom surmised that this may reflect an ancient rule where the firstborn was expected to care for the burial and worship of his deceased parents. Milgrom dismissed as without support the theory that the firstborn was originally offered as a sacrifice.

In April 2014, the Committee on Jewish Law and Standards of Conservative Judaism ruled that women are now equally responsible for observing commandments as men have been.

Terence Fretheim argued that  give a special twist to the issue of the firstborn, teaching that Israel was to be attentive to its firstborn because of the suffering of the Egyptian firstborn. Fretheim noted that  does not mention the redeemed Israelite children of Passover night but the sacrificed Egyptian firstborn, followed by "Therefore." Fretheim thus argued that the firstborn belong to God not only because Israelite children were saved but also because Egyptian children were killed. Fretheim argued that  thus reminds Israel at what cost Israel's firstborn were redeemed. Fretheim nonetheless considered it doubtful that child sacrifice was in view.

Commandments
According to Sefer ha-Chinuch, there are 9 positive and 11 negative commandments in the parashah:
Courts must calculate to determine when a new month begins.

To slaughter the Passover lamb at the specified time
To eat the Passover lamb with unleavened bread (matzah) and bitter herbs (maror) on the night of the fourteenth of Nisan
Not to eat the Passover meat raw or boiled
Not to leave any meat from the Passover lamb over until morning
To destroy all leavened bread on the 14th of Nisan
To eat unleavened bread (matzah) on the first night of Passover
Not to find chametz in your domain seven days
Not to eat mixtures containing chametz all seven days of Passover
An apostate must not eat from the Passover lamb.
A permanent or temporary hired worker must not eat from it.
Not to take the paschal meat from the confines of the group
Not to break any bones of the Passover lamb
An uncircumcised male must not eat from it.
To set aside the firstborn animals
Not to eat chametz all seven days of Passover
Not to see chametz in your domain seven days
To relate the Exodus from Egypt on the first night of Passover
To redeem the firstborn donkey by giving a lamb to a Kohen
To break the neck of the donkey if the owner does not intend to redeem it

In the liturgy

Also in the magid section, the Haggadah quotes  to elucidate the report in  that "the Lord brought us forth out of Egypt with a mighty hand." The Haggadah cites  for the proposition that God took the Israelites out of Egypt not through an angel, not through a seraph, not through an agent, but on God's own.

Also in the magid section, the Haggadah quotes  to provide the question of the wicked son and quotes  to answer him. And shortly thereafter, the Haggadah quotes  to answer the simple child and quotes  again to answer the child who does not know how to ask.

Also in the magid section, the Haggadah quotes  to answer the question: For what purpose did the Israelites eat the Passover offering at the time of the Temple in Jerusalem? The Haggadah quotes  for the proposition that the Israelites did so because God passed over the Israelites' houses in Egypt.

In the concluding nirtzah section, the Haggadah quotes the words "it is the Passover sacrifice" from  eight times as the refrain of a poem by Eleazar Kallir. Also in the nirtzah section, the Haggadah quotes the words "it was the middle of the night" from  eight times as the refrain of a poem by Yannai.

In the magid section, the Haggadah quotes  to answer the question: For what purpose do Jews eat unleavened bread (matzah)? The Haggadah quotes  for the proposition that Jews do so because there was not sufficient time for the Israelites' dough to become leavened before God redeemed them.

In the magid section, the Haggadah responds to a question that "one could think" that  raises—that the obligation to tell the Exodus story begins on the first of the month—and clarifies that the obligation begins when Jews have their maztah and maror in front of them.

Also in the magid section, the Haggadah quotes —emphasizing the word "for me" (li)—for the proposition that in every generation, Jews have a duty to regard themselves as though they personally had gone out of Egypt.

Haftarah

Connection to the Parashah
Both the parashah and the haftarah describe God's judgment against Egypt. The parashah reports that God told Moses to go (bo) to Pharaoh; the haftarah reports God's word that Nebuchadrezzar would come (la-vo) to Pharaoh. Both the parashah and the haftarah report a plague of locusts—literal in the parashah, figurative in the haftarah. Both the parashah and the haftarah report God's punishment of Egypt's gods. And both the parashah and the haftarah report God's ultimate deliverance of the Israelites from their captivity.

References

Further reading

The parashah has parallels or is discussed in these sources:

Biblical
 (God's destruction employing the flood);  (leaving Egypt with wealth);  (God's destruction of Sodom and Gomorrah).
 (command to kill sons);  (hardening Pharaoh's heart);  (hardening Pharaoh's heart);  (hardening Pharaoh's heart);  (hardening Pharaoh's heart);  (hardening Pharaoh's heart);  (firstborn);  (Passover);  (Passover).
, 49–52 (hyssop);  (Passover).
 (hardening of heart);  (hardening of heart);  (parting gifts for freed slaves);  (firstborn);  (Passover).
 (destruction of all but those with a red mark on their dwelling);  (hardening of heart).
 (firstborn).
 (slaying those without the mark).
 (darkness).
 ("Purge me with hyssop");  (plagues);  (plagues);  (midnight).
 (midnight).

Early nonrabbinic
The Passover Letter. Elephantine, 419–418 BCE. In, e.g., The Context of Scripture, Volume III: Archival Documents from the Biblical World, pages 116–17. Edited by William W. Hallo. New York: Brill, 2002.
Ezekiel the Tragedian. Exagōgē. Greece, 2nd century BCE. Translated by R.G. Robertson. In The Old Testament Pseudepigrapha: Volume 2: Expansions of the "Old Testament" and Legends, Wisdom and Philosophical Literature, Prayers, Psalms, and Odes, Fragments of Lost Judeo-Hellenistic works. Edited by James H. Charlesworth, pages 814–17. New York: Anchor Bible, 1985.
Jubilees chapter 49 Land of Israel, 2nd century BCE. In, e.g., The Book of Jubilees or the Little Genesis. Translated by Robert H. Charles. London: Black, 1902. In, e.g., The Book of Jubilees: Translation of Early Jewish and Palestinian Texts, pages 216–19. Lexington, Kentucky: Forgotten Books, 2007. (Passover).
Wisdom of Solomon chapters 17–18. Alexandria, Egypt, 2nd–1st century BCE.
1 Corinthians  Circa 53–54. (Passover).
Romans  1st century. (hardening Pharaoh's heart).
Hebrews  (hyssop);  (Passover). Late 1st century.
Mark  Circa 70 CE. (Passover).
Matthew  Circa 70–100 CE. (Passover).
Josephus. The Wars of the Jews, 5:9:4. Circa 75 CE. In, e.g., The Works of Josephus: Complete and Unabridged, New Updated Edition. Translated by William Whiston, 716. Peabody, Massachusetts: Hendrickson Publishers, 1987.
1 Peter  Circa 81 CE. (Passover).
Luke   Circa 80–150 CE. (Passover).
Josephus, Antiquities of the Jews 2:14:4 –2:15:1 . Circa 93–94. In, e.g., The Works of Josephus: Complete and Unabridged, New Updated Edition. Translated by William Whiston, pages 73–74. Peabody, Massachusetts: Hendrickson Publishers, 1987.
 Late 1st century. (changing hearts to God's purpose).
John  (hyssop);  Circa 90–110. ("Not one of his bones will be broken").
Justin Martyr. Dialogue with Trypho, chapters 40, 46. Circa 155–167. In, e.g., Justin Martyr. Dialogue with Trypho. Translated by Thomas B. Falls, edited by Michael Slusser. Washington, D.C.: Catholic University of America Press, revised edition, 2002. (Passover).
Melito of Sardis. On Pascha. Circa 180. In, e.g., On Pascha and Fragments. Edited by Stewart George Hall. Oxford: Clarendon Press, 1979. (Passover).

Classical rabbinic

Mishnah: Challah 1:2, 4:9; Orlah 3:3; Bikkurim 2:9; Pesachim 1:1–10:9; Beitzah 1:1–5:7; Rosh Hashanah 1:1; Megillah 3:4; Avodah Zarah 5:9; Zevahim 3:6; Menachot 3:7; Bekhorot 1:1–6:12, 8:1; Keritot 1:1; Parah 11:9. 3rd century. In, e.g., The Mishnah: A New Translation. Translated by Jacob Neusner, pages 148, 157, 165, 171, 229–51, 291–99, 320–21, 672, 705, 739, 787–800, 803, 836. New Haven: Yale University Press, 1988.
Tosefta: Terumot 10:7; Challah 2:9; Pisha (Pesachim) 1:1–10:13; Sukkah 2:1; Yom Tov (Beitzah) 1:4–5; Rosh Hashanah 1:1–3; Megillah 3:4; Sotah 4:5; Makkot 4:1; Zevachim 1:1; Menachot 8:28; Bekhorot 1:1–7:15. (Land of Israel, circa 250 CE). In, e.g., The Tosefta: Translated from the Hebrew, with a New Introduction. Translated by Jacob Neusner, volume 1, pages 198, 339, 471–522, 572, 585–86, 605, 645, 846; volume 2, pages 1208–09, 1308, 1445, 1469–94. Peabody, Massachusetts: Hendrickson Publishers, 2002.
Jerusalem Talmud: Berakhot 9a, 21b, 37a, 61a; Challah 49a; Orlah 35a; Shabbat 17a, 18b, 30a, 61a–b; Eruvin 24b, 63b; Pesachim 1a–86a; Shekalim 1b; Yoma 2a; Beitzah 1a–49b; Rosh Hashanah 1b, 6a, 11a, 17b–18a; Taanit 26a; Megillah 14b, 17b, 21a–b, 29b; Chagigah 13b; Yevamot 42a–43a; Nazir 22a; Gittin 20b; Kiddushin 19b, 22a; Sanhedrin 11b, 13a, 31a–b, 51b, 69a; Horayot 10a. Tiberias, Land of Israel, circa 400 C.E. In, e.g., Talmud Yerushalmi. Edited by Chaim Malinowitz, Yisroel Simcha Schorr, and Mordechai Marcus, volumes 1–2, 11–14, 16–19, 20–21, 23–27, 30, 34, 38, 40, 44–45, 49. Brooklyn: Mesorah Publications, 2005–2020. And in, e.g., The Jerusalem Talmud: A Translation and Commentary. Edited by Jacob Neusner and translated by Jacob Neusner, Tzvee Zahavy, B. Barry Levy, and Edward Goldman. Peabody, Massachusetts: Hendrickson Publishers, 2009
Mekhilta of Rabbi Ishmael, Tractate Pisha, chapters 1:1–18:2. Land of Israel, late 4th century. In, e.g., Mekhilta de-Rabbi Ishmael. Translated by Jacob Z. Lauterbach, volume 1, pages 1–114. Philadelphia: Jewish Publication Society, 1933, reissued 2004.
Mekhilta of Rabbi Simeon, Tractate Pisha, chapters 3–19. Land of Israel, 5th century. In, e.g., Mekhilta de-Rabbi Shimon bar Yohai. Translated by W. David Nelson, pages 10–79. Philadelphia: Jewish Publication Society, 2006.
Babylonian Talmud: Berakhot 3b–4a, 9a–b, 10b, 37a, 38b, 55b–56b; Shabbat 24b–25a, 28b, 60b, 87a–b, 108a, 114b, 133a, 147b; Eruvin 23a, 27a, 96a; Pesachim 2a–121b; Yoma 36a, 49b, 51a, 79b; Sukkah 11b, 13a, 27a, 29a, 33a, 42b; Beitzah 2a–40b, Rosh Hashanah 2a, 4a–b, 7a, 8b, 11b, 20a, 22a, 25b; Taanit 7a; Megillah 5a, 6b, 7b, 21a, 29a, 30a, 31a; Chagigah 7b, 10b, 16b–17a; Yevamot 5b, 40a, 46a, 48a, 62a, 70a–71a, 72a, 74a; Ketubot 7a, 102a, 111b; Nedarim 25a, 36a; Nazir 7a, 23a; Gittin 10a, 25a, 38a; Kiddushin 6b, 29a, 34a, 35a, 37a–b, 41b–42a, 57b, 72b, 76a; Bava Kamma 13a, 37b, 41a, 50b, 54a–b, 60a, 63a, 64a, 76b, 78a, 110b; Bava Metzia 6b, 42a, 115b; Bava Batra 97b, 118b; Sanhedrin 4b, 12b, 18a, 36a, 42a, 48b, 63a, 91a, 100a; Makkot 4b, 8b, 11a, 13a–b, 15a, 16a, 17a–b, 21b–22a; Shevuot 3b; Avodah Zarah 24a, 27a, 74a; Zevachim 7a–b, 9a, 10b–12a, 23a, 25b, 36a, 37b, 57b, 91a, 102a, 106b, 116a; Menachot 28a, 29a–b, 34a–b, 36b–37a, 42b, 47b, 49b, 53a, 66a, 67a, 82b, 83b, 98a; Chullin 11a, 17b, 68a, 69b–70a, 74b, 78b, 82b, 91a, 115a, 120a, 129a, 133b–34a, 136b, 141b; Bekhorot 2a–61a; Arakhin 8b, 13b, 18a–b, 19b, 24b; Temurah 4b, 5b, 18b, 30b; Keritot 2a, 4a, 28a; Meilah 13a. Sasanian Empire, 6th century. In, e.g., Talmud Bavli. Edited by Yisroel Simcha Schorr, Chaim Malinowitz, and Mordechai Marcus, 72 volumes. Brooklyn: Mesorah Publications, 2006.
Song of Songs Rabbah. 6th–7th century. In, e.g., Midrash Rabbah: Song of Songs. Translated by Maurice Simon, volume 9, pages 2, 45, 47, 80–81, 100, 117–18, 121–23, 138–39, 163, 165, 219, 238, 283. London: Soncino Press, 1939.

Medieval

Saadia Gaon. The Book of Beliefs and Opinions. Baghdad, Babylonia, 933. Translated by Samuel Rosenblatt, pages 119, 199, 254, 272, 299, 424. New Haven: Yale University Press, 1948.
Exodus Rabbah 13:1–19:8. 10th century. In, e.g., Midrash Rabbah: Exodus. Translated by S. M. Lehrman. London: Soncino Press, 1939.
Rashi. Commentary. Exodus 10–13. Troyes, France, late 11th century. In, e.g., Rashi. The Torah: With Rashi's Commentary Translated, Annotated, and Elucidated. Translated and annotated by Yisrael Isser Zvi Herczeg, volume 2, pages 91–141. Brooklyn: Mesorah Publications, 1994.
Rashbam. Commentary on the Torah. Troyes, early 12th century. In, e.g., Rashbam's Commentary on Exodus: An Annotated Translation. Edited and translated by Martin I. Lockshin, pages 93–132. Atlanta: Scholars Press, 1997.
Judah Halevi. Kuzari. 2:80; 3:35. Toledo, Spain, 1130–1140. In, e.g., Jehuda Halevi. Kuzari: An Argument for the Faith of Israel. Introduction by Henry Slonimsky, pages 132, 166. New York: Schocken, 1964.
Abraham ibn Ezra. Commentary on the Torah. France, 1153. In, e.g., Ibn Ezra's Commentary on the Pentateuch: Exodus (Shemot). Translated and annotated by H. Norman Strickman and Arthur M. Silver, volume 2, pages 183–266. New York: Menorah Publishing Company, 1996.
Maimonides. Mishneh Torah: Hilchot Teshuvah, chapter 3, paragraph 3. Egypt. Circa 1170–1180. In, e.g., Mishneh Torah: Hilchot Teshuvah: The Laws of Repentance. Translated by Eliyahu Touger, pages 140–48. New York: Moznaim Publishing, 1990.
Maimonides. Mishneh Torah: Hilchot Shekalim (The Laws of Shekalim) and Hilchot Kiddush HaChodesh (The Laws of Sanctification of the New Moon), chapter 5. In, e.g., Mishneh Torah: Hilchot Shekalim: The Laws of Shekalim: and Hilchot Kiddush HaChodesh: The Laws of Sanctification of the New Moon. Translated by Eliyahu Touger, volume 14, pages 102–13. New York: Moznaim Publishing, 1993.
Maimonides. The Eight Chapters on Ethics, chapter 8. Egypt. Late 12th century. In, e.g., The Eight Chapters of Maimonides on Ethics (Shemonah Perakim): A Psychological and Ethical Treatise. Edited, annotated, and translated, with an introduction by Joseph I. Gorfinkle, pages 95–96. New York: Columbia University Press, 1912. Reprinted by Forgotten Books, 2012.
Maimonides. The Guide for the Perplexed. Cairo, Egypt, 1190. In, e.g., Moses Maimonides. The Guide for the Perplexed. Translated by Michael Friedländer, pages 27, 30, 32, 36, 55–56, 214, 325, 340, 346, 359, 361, 370. New York: Dover Publications, 1956.
Hezekiah ben Manoah. Hizkuni. France, circa 1240. In, e.g., Chizkiyahu ben Manoach. Chizkuni: Torah Commentary. Translated and annotated by Eliyahu Munk, volume 2, pages 400–41. Jerusalem: Ktav Publishers, 2013.
Nachmanides. Commentary on the Torah. Jerusalem, circa 1270. In, e.g., Ramban (Nachmanides): Commentary on the Torah. Translated by Charles B. Chavel, volume 2, pages 100–75. New York: Shilo Publishing House, 1973.
Zohar, part 2, pages 32b–44a. Spain, late 13th century. In, e.g., The Zohar: Pritzker Edition. Translation and commentary by Daniel C. Matt, volume 4, pages 136–200. Stanford: Stanford University Press, 2007.
Bahya ben Asher. Commentary on the Torah. Spain, early 14th century. In, e.g., Midrash Rabbeinu Bachya: Torah Commentary by Rabbi Bachya ben Asher. Translated and annotated by Eliyahu Munk, volume 3, pages 855–921. Jerusalem: Lambda Publishers, 2003.
Jacob ben Asher (Baal Ha-Turim). Commentary on the Torah. Early 14th century. In, e.g., Baal Haturim Chumash: Shemos/Exodus. Translated by Eliyahu Touger, edited and annotated by Avie Gold, volume 2, pages 609–51. Brooklyn: Mesorah Publications, 2000.
Nissim of Gerona (The Ran). Derashos HaRan (Discourses of the Ran), discourse 3. Barcelona, Catalonia, 14th century. In, e.g., Yehuda Meir Keilson. Derashos HaRan: Discourses of the Ran, Rabbeinu Nissim ben Reuven of Gerona, Translated, Annotated, and Elucidated. Volume 1, pages 199–275. Brooklyn: Mesorah Publications, 2019.
Isaac ben Moses Arama. Akedat Yizhak (The Binding of Isaac). Late 15th century. In, e.g., Yitzchak Arama. Akeydat Yitzchak: Commentary of Rabbi Yitzchak Arama on the Torah. Translated and condensed by Eliyahu Munk, volume 1, pages 345–67. New York, Lambda Publishers, 2001.

Modern

Isaac Abravanel. Commentary on the Torah. Italy, between 1492 and 1509. In, e.g., Abarbanel: Selected Commentaries on the Torah: Volume 2: Shemos/Exodus. Translated and annotated by Israel Lazar, pages 134–72. Brooklyn: CreateSpace, 2015.
Abraham Saba. Ẓeror ha-Mor (Bundle of Myrrh). Fez, Morocco, circa 1500. In, e.g., Tzror Hamor: Torah Commentary by Rabbi Avraham Sabba. Translated and annotated by Eliyahu Munk, volume 3, pages 921–67. Jerusalem, Lambda Publishers, 2008.
Obadiah ben Jacob Sforno. Commentary on the Torah. Venice, 1567. In, e.g., Sforno: Commentary on the Torah. Translation and explanatory notes by Raphael Pelcovitz, pages 328–45. Brooklyn: Mesorah Publications, 1997.
Moshe Alshich. Commentary on the Torah. Safed, circa 1593. In, e.g., Moshe Alshich. Midrash of Rabbi Moshe Alshich on the Torah. Translated and annotated by Eliyahu Munk, volume 2, pages 401–29. New York, Lambda Publishers, 2000.
Shlomo Ephraim Luntschitz. Kli Yakar. Lublin, 1602. In, e.g., Kli Yakar: Shemos. Translated by Elihu Levine, volume 1, pages 131–94. Southfield, Michigan: Targum Press/Feldheim Publishers, 2002.
Menasseh ben Israel. El Conciliador (The Conciliator). Amsterdam, 1632. In The Conciliator of R. Manasseh Ben Israel: A Reconcilement of the Apparent Contradictions in Holy Scripture: To Which Are Added Explanatory Notes, and Biographical Notices of the Quoted Authorities. Translated by Elias Hiam Lindo, pages 124–36. London, 1842. Reprinted by, e.g., Nabu Press, 2010.
Avraham Yehoshua Heschel. Commentaries on the Torah. Cracow, Poland, mid 17th century. Compiled as Chanukat HaTorah. Edited by Chanoch Henoch Erzohn. Piotrkow, Poland, 1900. In Avraham Yehoshua Heschel. Chanukas HaTorah: Mystical Insights of Rav Avraham Yehoshua Heschel on Chumash. Translated by Avraham Peretz Friedman, pages 132–41. Southfield, Michigan: Targum Press/Feldheim Publishers, 2004.
Yaakov Culi. Me'am Lo'ez. Constantinople, 1732. In Yaakov Culi. The Torah Anthology: Me'am Lo'ez. Translated by Aryeh Kaplan, volume 5, pages 1–150. Jerusalem: Moznaim Publishing, 1979.
Thomas Hobbes. Leviathan, 3:38. England, 1651. Reprint edited by C. B. Macpherson, page 487. Harmondsworth, England: Penguin Classics, 1982.
Shabbethai Bass. Sifsei Chachamim. Amsterdam, 1680. In, e.g., Sefer Shemos: From the Five Books of the Torah: Volume 1: Shemos–Yitro: Chumash: Targum Okelos: Rashi: Sifsei Chachamim: Yalkut: Haftaros, translated by Avrohom Y. Davis, pages 119–85. Lakewood Township, New Jersey: Metsudah Publications, 2009.
Chaim ibn Attar. Ohr ha-Chaim. Venice, 1742. In Chayim ben Attar. Or Hachayim: Commentary on the Torah. Translated by Eliyahu Munk, volume 2, pages 533–73. Brooklyn: Lambda Publishers, 1999.
Nachman of Breslov. Teachings. Bratslav, Ukraine, before 1811. In Rebbe Nachman's Torah: Breslov Insights into the Weekly Torah Reading: Exodus-Leviticus. Compiled by Chaim Kramer, edited by Y. Hall, pages 64–95. Jerusalem: Breslov Research Institute, 2011.
Henry Wadsworth Longfellow The Jewish Cemetery at Newport . Boston, 1854. In Harold Bloom. American Religious Poems, pages 80–81. New York: Library of America, 2006.
Samson Raphael Hirsch. The Pentateuch: Exodus. Translated by Isaac Levy, volume 2, pages 107–74. Gateshead: Judaica Press, 2nd edition 1999. Originally published as Der Pentateuch uebersetzt und erklaert. Frankfurt, 1867–1878.
Samuel David Luzzatto (Shadal). Commentary on the Torah. Padua, 1871. In, e.g., Samuel David Luzzatto. Torah Commentary. Translated and annotated by Eliyahu Munk, volume 2, pages 594–633. New York: Lambda Publishers, 2012.
Malbim. The Torah and the Commandments. Warsaw, 1874–80. In, e.g., Malbim: Rabbenu Meir Leibush ben Yechiel Michel. Commentary on the Torah. Translated by Zvi Faier, volume 4, pages 254–84; volume 5, pages 1–386. Israel: M.P. Press/Hillel Press, 1984.
Yehudah Aryeh Leib Alter. Sefat Emet. Góra Kalwaria (Ger), Poland, before 1906. Excerpted in The Language of Truth: The Torah Commentary of Sefat Emet. Translated and interpreted by Arthur Green, pages 93–97. Philadelphia: Jewish Publication Society, 1998. Reprinted 2012.
Hermann Cohen. Religion of Reason: Out of the Sources of Judaism. Translated with an introduction by Simon Kaplan; introductory essays by Leo Strauss, pages 121, 328. New York: Ungar, 1972. Reprinted Atlanta: Scholars Press, 1995. Originally published as Religion der Vernunft aus den Quellen des Judentums. Leipzig: Gustav Fock, 1919.
James Joyce. Ulysses, chapter 7 (Aeolus). Paris: Shakespeare and Company, 1922. Reprinted, e.g., Ulysses: The Corrected Text. Edited by Hans Walter Gabler with Wolfhard Steppe and Claus Melchior, pages 116–17. New York: Random House, 1986. (The orator John F. Taylor is quoted saying: "It seemed to me that I had been transported into a country far away from this country, into an age remote from this age, that I stood in ancient Egypt and that I was listening to the speech of some highpriest of that land addressed to the youthful Moses. . . . And it seemed to me that I heard the voice of that Egyptian highpriest raised in a tone of like haughtiness and like pride. I heard his words and their meaning was revealed to me. . . . Why will you Jews not accept our culture, our religion and our language? You are a tribe of nomad herdsmen: we are a mighty people. You have no cities nor no wealth: our cities are hives of humanity and our galleys, trireme and quadrireme, laden with all manner merchandise furrow the waters of the known globe. You have but emerged from primitive conditions: we have a literature, a priesthood, an agelong history and a polity. . . . But, ladies and gentlemen, had the youthful Moses listened to and accepted that view of life, had he bowed his head and bowed his will and bowed his spirit before that arrogant admonition he would never have brought the chosen people out of their house of bondage, nor followed the pillar of the cloud by day. He would never have spoken with the Eternal amid lightnings on Sinai's mountaintop nor ever have come down with the light of inspiration shining in his countenance and bearing in his arms the tables of the law, graven in the language of the outlaw.").
Alexander Alan Steinbach. Sabbath Queen: Fifty-four Bible Talks to the Young Based on Each Portion of the Pentateuch, pages 45–48. New York: Behrman's Jewish Book House, 1936.
Benno Jacob. The Second Book of the Bible: Exodus. London, 1940. Translated by Walter Jacob, pages 280–376. Hoboken, New Jersey: KTAV Publishing House, 1992.
A. M. Klein. Concerning Four Strange Sons. Circa 1937. Haggadah. 1940. In The Collected Poems of A.M. Klein, pages 78–79, 143–46. Toronto: McGraw-Hill Ryerson, 1974.
Thomas Mann. Joseph and His Brothers. Translated by John E. Woods, pages 79, 384–86, 715, 788. New York: Alfred A. Knopf, 2005. Originally published as Joseph und seine Brüder. Stockholm: Bermann-Fischer Verlag, 1943.
Umberto Cassuto. A Commentary on the Book of Exodus. Jerusalem, 1951. Translated by Israel Abrahams, pages 122–54. Jerusalem: The Magnes Press, The Hebrew University, 1967.
Ziony Zevit. "The Priestly Redaction and Interpretation of the Plague Narrative in Exodus." The Jewish Quarterly Review, new series, volume 66, number 4 (April 1976): pages 193–211.
Robert R. Wilson, "The Hardening of Pharaoh's Heart." Catholic Biblical Quarterly, volume 41 (number 1) (1979): pages 18–36.
Elie Munk. The Call of the Torah: An Anthology of Interpretation and Commentary on the Five Books of Moses. Translated by E.S. Mazer, volume 2, pages 112–61. Brooklyn: Mesorah Publications, 1995. Originally published as La Voix de la Thora. Paris: Fondation Samuel et Odette Levy, 1981.
Judith R. Baskin. Pharaoh's Counsellors: Job, Jethro, and Balaam in Rabbinic and Patristic Tradition. Brown Judaic Studies, 1983.
Dan Jacobson. "A Plague of Darkness." In Gates to the New City: A Treasury of Modern Jewish Tales. Edited by Howard Schwartz, pages 157–60. New York: Avon, 1983. Reissue edition Jason Aronson, 1991.
Baruch M. Bokser. Origins of the Seder: The Passover Rite and Early Rabbinic Judaism. Oakland: University of California Press, 1984; reprinted New York: Jewish Theological Seminary Press, 2002.
Mayer Rabinowitz. "A Pesah Guide." New York: Rabbinical Assembly, 1984. OH 453.1984.
Pinchas H. Peli. Torah Today: A Renewed Encounter with Scripture, pages 63–66. Washington, D.C.: B'nai B'rith Books, 1987.
Mark S. Smith. The Early History of God: Yahweh and the Other Deities in Ancient Israel, pages 2, 10, 108, 113. New York: HarperSanFrancisco, 1990.
Ziony Zevit. "Three Ways to Look at the Ten Plagues:Were they natural disasters, a demonstration of the impotence of the Egyptian gods or an undoing of Creation? Bible Review, volume 6, number 3 (1990).
Harvey J. Fields. A Torah Commentary for Our Times: Volume II: Exodus and Leviticus, pages 25–31. New York: UAHC Press, 1991.
Nahum M. Sarna. The JPS Torah Commentary: Exodus: The Traditional Hebrew Text with the New JPS Translation, pages 48–68, 270–73. Philadelphia: Jewish Publication Society, 1991.
Nehama Leibowitz. New Studies in Shemot (Exodus), volume 1, pages 178–230. Jerusalem: Haomanim Press, 1993. Reprinted as New Studies in the Weekly Parasha. Lambda Publishers, 2010.
Gerald Skolnik. "Should There Be a Special Ceremony in Recognition of a First-Born Female Child?" New York: Rabbinical Assembly, 1993. YD 305:1.1993. In Responsa: 1991–2000: The Committee on Jewish Law and Standards of the Conservative Movement. Edited by Kassel Abelson and David J. Fine, pages 163–65. New York: Rabbinical Assembly, 2002.
Aaron Wildavsky. Assimilation versus Separation: Joseph the Administrator and the Politics of Religion in Biblical Israel, page 14. New Brunswick, New Jersey: Transaction Publishers, 1993.
Joseph B. Soloveitchik. Festival of Freedom: Essays on Pesah and the Haggadah. Before 1994. Reprinted Ktav Publishing, 2006.
Walter Brueggemann. "The Book of Exodus." In The New Interpreter's Bible. Edited by Leander E. Keck, volume 1, pages 760–987. Nashville: Abingdon Press, 1994.
Shimon Finkelman, Moshe Dov Stein, Moshe Lieber, Nosson Scherman. Pesach-Passover: Its Observance, Laws and Significance / A Presentation Based on Talmudic and Traditional Sources. Brooklyn: Mesorah Publications, 1994.
Judith S. Antonelli. "Firstborn Daughters." In In the Image of God: A Feminist Commentary on the Torah, pages 154–66. Northvale, New Jersey: Jason Aronson, 1995.
W. Gunther Plaut. The Haftarah Commentary, pages 140–48. New York: UAHC Press, 1996.
Sorel Goldberg Loeb and Barbara Binder Kadden. Teaching Torah: A Treasury of Insights and Activities, pages 100–06. Denver: A.R.E. Publishing, 1997.
Barack Obama. Dreams from My Father, page 294. New York: Three Rivers Press, 1995, 2004. (Moses and Pharaoh).
Jacob Milgrom. "The Alien in Your Midst: Every Nation Has Its Ger: The Permanent Resident. The Torah Commands Us, First, Not To Oppress the Ger, and Then To Befriend and Love Him." Bible Review, volume 11 (numbers 6) (Dec. 1995).
Ellen Frankel. The Five Books of Miriam: A Woman's Commentary on the Torah, pages 105–08. New York: G. P. Putnam's Sons, 1996.
Robert Goodman. "Pesach" and "Rosh Chodesh." In Teaching Jewish Holidays: History, Values, and Activities, pages 153–72, 241–47. Denver: A.R.E. Publishing, 1997.
William H.C. Propp. Exodus 1–18, volume 2, pages 290–461. New York: Anchor Bible, 1998.
Exodus to Deuteronomy: A Feminist Companion to the Bible (Second Series). Edited by Athalya Brenner, pages 31, 72, 95–96. Sheffield: Sheffield Academic Press, 2000.
Avivah Gottlieb Zornberg. The Particulars of Rapture: Reflections on Exodus, pages 132–98. New York: Doubleday, 2001.
Lainie Blum Cogan and Judy Weiss. Teaching Haftarah: Background, Insights, and Strategies, pages 422–27. Denver: A.R.E. Publishing, 2002.
Michael Fishbane. The JPS Bible Commentary: Haftarot, pages 93–97. Philadelphia: Jewish Publication Society, 2002.
Robert Alter. The Five Books of Moses: A Translation with Commentary, pages 365–88. New York: W.W. Norton & Co., 2004.
Martin Sicker. A Passover Seder Companion and Analytic Introduction to the Haggadah. New York: iUniverse, 2004.
Jeffrey H. Tigay. "Exodus." In The Jewish Study Bible. Edited by Adele Berlin and Marc Zvi Brettler, pages 122–33. New York: Oxford University Press, 2004.
Professors on the Parashah: Studies on the Weekly Torah Reading Edited by Leib Moscovitz, pages 100–04. Jerusalem: Urim Publications, 2005.
W. Gunther Plaut. The Torah: A Modern Commentary: Revised Edition. Revised edition edited by David E.S. Stern, pages 405–29. New York: Union for Reform Judaism, 2006.
Diane Ackerman. The Zookeeper's Wife: A War Story, pages 181–82, 211. New York: W.W. Norton, 2007. (Passover in the Warsaw Ghetto).
Suzanne A. Brody. "Pidyon HaBen." In Dancing in the White Spaces: The Yearly Torah Cycle and More Poems, page 77. Shelbyville, Kentucky: Wasteland Press, 2007.
Esther Jungreis. Life Is a Test, page 117. Brooklyn: Shaar Press, 2007.
James L. Kugel. How To Read the Bible: A Guide to Scripture, Then and Now, pages 217–32, 278, 299, 318–24, 669. New York: Free Press, 2007.
Kenton L. Sparks. "'Enūma Elish' and Priestly Mimesis: Elite Emulation in Nascent Judaism." Journal of Biblical Literature, volume 126 (2007): 635–37. ("Priestly Mimesis in the Exodus Story").
The Torah: A Women's Commentary. Edited by Tamara Cohn Eskenazi and Andrea L. Weiss, pages 355–78. New York: URJ Press, 2008.
Thomas B. Dozeman. Commentary on Exodus, pages 238–98. Grand Rapids, Michigan: William B. Eerdmans Publishing Company, 2009.
Reuven Hammer. Entering Torah: Prefaces to the Weekly Torah Portion, pages 89–93. New York: Gefen Publishing House, 2009.
Rebecca G.S. Idestrom. "Echoes of the Book of Exodus in Ezekiel." Journal for the Study of the Old Testament, volume 33 (number 4) (June 2009): pages 489–510. (Motifs from Exodus found in Ezekiel, including the call narrative, divine encounters, captivity, signs, plagues, judgment, redemption, tabernacle/temple, are considered.).
Jason Gary Klein. "The Ritual of Storytelling: Parashat Bo (Exodus 10:1–13:16)." In Torah Queeries: Weekly Commentaries on the Hebrew Bible. Edited by Gregg Drinkwater, Joshua Lesser, and David Shneer; foreword by Judith Plaskow, pages 85–88. New York: New York University Press, 2009.
Bruce Wells. "Exodus." In Zondervan Illustrated Bible Backgrounds Commentary. Edited by John H. Walton, volume 1, pages 198–211. Grand Rapids, Michigan: Zondervan, 2009.
Julie Cadwallader-Staub. Joy. In Face to Face: A Poetry Collection. DreamSeeker Books, 2010. ("land of milk and honey").
Idan Dershowitz. "A Land Flowing with Fat and Honey." Vetus Testamentum, volume 60 (number 2) (2010): pages 172–76.
Jonathan Sacks. Covenant & Conversation: A Weekly Reading of the Jewish Bible: Exodus: The Book of Redemption, pages 69–94. Jerusalem: Maggid Books, 2010.
Sam Ernst and Jim Dunn. "A Tale of Two Audreys." In Haven, season 2, episode 1. Entertainment One, 2011. (plagues plot element).
Katherine Low. "Implications Surrounding Girding the Loins in Light of Gender, Body, and Power." Journal for the Study of the Old Testament, volume 36 (number 1) (September 2011): pages 3–30..
Jeffrey Stackert. "Why Does the Plague of Darkness Last for Three Days? Source Ascription and Literary Motif in Exodus 10:21–23, 27." Vetus Testamentum, volume 61 (number 4) (2011): pages 657–76.
William G. Dever. The Lives of Ordinary People in Ancient Israel: When Archaeology and the Bible Intersect, page 188. Grand Rapids, Michigan: William B. Eerdmans Publishing Company, 2012.
Shmuel Herzfeld. "Do Not Leave Your Doorway until the Morning." In Fifty-Four Pick Up: Fifteen-Minute Inspirational Torah Lessons, pages 86–92. Jerusalem: Gefen Publishing House, 2012.
Torah MiEtzion: New Readings in Tanach: Shemot. Edited by Ezra Bick and Yaakov Beasley, pages 109–55. Jerusalem: Maggid Books, 2012.
Fernanda Santos. "Brooklyn Matzo Prebaked in an Arizona Field: A Safeguarded Grain Untouched by Rain or Other Moisture." The New York Times. June 29, 2013. Page A1.
Tibor Krausz. "The divine confidence trick." The Jerusalem Report, volume 25 (number 1) (April 21, 2014): page 47.
Michael Balinsky. "Passover Jews and Shavuot Jews: On Shavuot, we are all called to Mount Sinai to affirm our covenantal bond with God and our people." The Jerusalem Report, volume 25 (number 5) (June 16, 2014): page 47.
Jonathan Sacks. Lessons in Leadership: A Weekly Reading of the Jewish Bible, pages 73–77. New Milford, Connecticut: Maggid Books, 2015.
David Fohrman. The Exodus You Almost Passed Over. Aleph Beta Press, 2016.
Jean-Pierre Isbouts. Archaeology of the Bible: The Greatest Discoveries from Genesis to the Roman Era, pages 105–07. Washington, D.C.: National Geographic, 2016.
"The Hittites: Between Tradition and History." Biblical Archaeology Review, volume 42 (number 2) (March/April 2016): pages 28–40, 68.
Jonathan Sacks. Essays on Ethics: A Weekly Reading of the Jewish Bible, pages 91–95. New Milford, Connecticut: Maggid Books, 2016.
Shai Held. The Heart of Torah, Volume 1: Essays on the Weekly Torah Portion: Genesis and Exodus, pages 144–54. Philadelphia: Jewish Publication Society, 2017.
James L. Kugel. The Great Shift: Encountering God in Biblical Times, page 408. Boston: Houghton Mifflin Harcourt, 2017.
Steven Levy and Sarah Levy. The JPS Rashi Discussion Torah Commentary, pages 47–49. Philadelphia: Jewish Publication Society, 2017.
Pekka Pitkänen. "Ancient Israelite Population Economy: Ger, Toshav, Nakhri and Karat as Settler Colonial Categories." Journal for the Study of the Old Testament, volume 42 (number 2) (December 2017): pages 139–53.
Bill Dauster. "Pharaoh's Administration Offers a Cautionary Tale for Today." Washington Jewish Week. January 11, 2018, page 19.
David L. Abramson. "Do you really believe in bashert?" Washington Jewish Week. January 18, 2018, page 31.
Biblical Archaeology Society Staff. "Exodus in the Bible and the Egyptian Plagues: Can we make sense of the Biblical plagues?" Bible History Daily, March 31, 2020.

External links

Texts
Masoretic text and 1917 JPS translation
Hear the parashah chanted
Hear the parashah read in Hebrew

Commentaries

Academy for Jewish Religion, California
Academy for Jewish Religion, New York
Aish.com 
Akhlah: The Jewish Children's Learning Network
Aleph Beta Academy
American Jewish University—Ziegler School of Rabbinic Studies
Anshe Emes Synagogue, Los Angeles
Ari Goldwag
Ascent of Safed
Bar-Ilan University 
Chabad.org
eparsha.com
G-dcast
The Israel Koschitzky Virtual Beit Midrash
Jewish Agency for Israel
Jewish Theological Seminary
Kabbala Online
Mechon Hadar
Miriam Aflalo
MyJewishLearning.com
Ohr Sameach
Orthodox Union
OzTorah, Torah from Australia
Oz Ve Shalom—Netivot Shalom
Pardes from Jerusalem
Professor James L. Kugel
Professor Michael Carasik
Rabbi Dov Linzer
Rabbi Fabian Werbin
Rabbi Jonathan Sacks
RabbiShimon.com 
Rabbi Shlomo Riskin
Rabbi Shmuel Herzfeld
Rabbi Stan Levin 
Reconstructionist Judaism
Sephardic Institute
Shiur.com
613.org Jewish Torah Audio
Talia Hava Davis
Tanach Study Center
Teach613.org, Torah Education at Cherry Hill
TheTorah.com
Torah from Dixie 
Torah.org
TorahVort.com
Union for Reform Judaism
United Synagogue of Conservative Judaism
What's Bothering Rashi?
Yeshivat Chovevei Torah
Yeshiva University

Weekly Torah readings in Shevat
Weekly Torah readings from Exodus